Keyboard works by Johann Sebastian Bach traditionally refers to Chapter 8 in the BWV catalogue or the fifth series of the New Bach Edition, both of which list compositions for a solo keyboard instrument like the harpsichord or the clavichord. Despite the fact that the organ is also a keyboard instrument, and that in Bach's time the distinction wasn't always made whether a keyboard composition was for organ or another keyboard instrument, Wolfgang Schmieder ranged organ compositions in a separate section of the Bach-Werke-Verzeichnis (Nos. 525-771). Also other compositions for keyboard, like compositions for lute-harpsichord and fortepiano were listed outside the "Klavierwerke" range by Schmieder. Lute works are in the range 995–1000, Chapter 9 in the BWV catalogue.

Works for keyboard (BWV 772–994)

Inventions and Sinfonias (772–801)

 BWV 772 – Invention No. 1 in C major
 BWV 772a – Invention No. 1 in C major (alternative version of BWV 772)
 BWV 773 – Invention No. 2 in C minor
 BWV 774 – Invention No. 3 in D major
 BWV 775 – Invention No. 4 in D minor
 BWV 776 – Invention No. 5 in E-flat major
 BWV 777 – Invention No. 6 in E major
 BWV 778 – Invention No. 7 in E minor
 BWV 779 – Invention No. 8 in F major
 BWV 780 – Invention No. 9 in F minor
 BWV 781 – Invention No. 10 in G major
 BWV 782 – Invention No. 11 in G minor
 BWV 783 – Invention No. 12 in A major
 BWV 784 – Invention No. 13 in A minor 
 BWV 785 – Invention No. 14 in B-flat major
 BWV 786 – Invention No. 15 in B minor
 BWV 787 – Sinfonia No. 1 in C major
 BWV 788 – Sinfonia No. 2 in C minor
 BWV 789 – Sinfonia No. 3 in D major
 BWV 790 – Sinfonia No. 4 in D minor
 BWV 791 – Sinfonia No. 5 in E-flat major
 BWV 792 – Sinfonia No. 6 in E major
 BWV 793 – Sinfonia No. 7 in E minor
 BWV 794 – Sinfonia No. 8 in F major
 BWV 795 – Sinfonia No. 9 in F minor
 BWV 796 – Sinfonia No. 10 in G major
 BWV 797 – Sinfonia No. 11 in G minor
 BWV 798 – Sinfonia No. 12 in A major
 BWV 799 – Sinfonia No. 13 in A minor
 BWV 800 – Sinfonia No. 14 in B-flat major
 BWV 801 – Sinfonia No. 15 in B minor

Four Duets from Clavier-Übung III (802–805)

 BWV 802 – Duet in E minor
 BWV 803 – Duet in F major
 BWV 804 – Duet in G major
 BWV 805 – Duet in A minor

English Suites (806–811)
 BWV 806 – English Suite No. 1 in A major
 BWV 807 – English Suite No. 2 in A minor
 BWV 808 – English Suite No. 3 in G minor
 BWV 809 – English Suite No. 4 in F major
 BWV 810 – English Suite No. 5 in E minor
 BWV 811 – English Suite No. 6 in D minor

French Suites (812–817)
 BWV 812 – French Suite No. 1 in D minor
 BWV 813 – French Suite No. 2 in C minor
 BWV 813a – French Suite No. 2 in C minor (alternative version of movement 5: Menuet)
 BWV 814 – French Suite No. 3 in B minor
 BWV 815 – French Suite No. 4 in E-flat major
 BWV 815a – French Suite No. 4 in E-flat major (alternative versions of several movements)
 BWV 816 – French Suite No. 5 in G major
 BWV 817 – French Suite No. 6 in E major

Miscellaneous suites (818–824)
 BWV 818 – Suite in A minor
 BWV 818a – Suite in A minor (alternative version of BWV 818)
 BWV 819 – Suite in E-flat major
 BWV 819a – Suite in E-flat major (alternative version of movement 1: Allemande from BWV 819)
 BWV 820 – Overture (Suite) in F major
 BWV 821 – Suite in B-flat major (doubtful)
 BWV 822 – Suite in G minor, 
 BWV 823 – Suite in F minor
 BWV 824 – Suite in A major (spurious, composed by Georg Philipp Telemann, TWV 32:14)

Clavier-Übung I: Partitas for keyboard (825–830)
Clavier-Übung I, six Partitas for keyboard:
 BWV 825 – Partita in B-flat major
 BWV 826 – Partita in C minor
 BWV 827 – Partita in A minor
 BWV 828 – Partita in D major
 BWV 829 – Partita in G major
 BWV 830 – Partita in E minor

French Overture, from Clavier-Übung II (831)
 BWV 831 – Overture in the French Style, in B minor
 BWV 831a – Earlier version in C minor

Suites and suite movements (832–845)
 BWV 832 – Suite in A major
 BWV 833 – Prelude and Partita in F major
 BWV 834 – Allemande in C minor (doubtful)
 BWV 835 – Allemande in A minor (spurious, possibly by Johann Philipp Kirnberger)
 BWV 836 – Allemande in G minor
 BWV 837 – Allemande in G minor
 BWV 838 – Allemande and Courante in A major (spurious, possibly by Christoph Graupner, GWV 849)
 BWV 839 – Sarabande in G minor (doubtful)
 BWV 840 – Courante in G major (spurious, after the 2nd movement of Telemann's Ouverture in G major, TWV 32:13)
 BWV 841 – Minuet in G major (from the 1722 Notebook for Anna Magdalena Bach)
 BWV 842 – Minuet in G minor
 BWV 843 – Minuet in G major
 BWV 844 – Scherzo in D minor (doubtful)
 BWV 844a – Scherzo in D minor (alternative version of BWV 844, doubtful)
 BWV 845 – Gigue in F minor (doubtful)

The Well-Tempered Clavier (846–893)

The Well-Tempered Clavier, Book I:
 BWV 846 – Prelude and Fugue in C major
 BWV 846a – Prelude in C major (alternative version of BWV 846, only Prelude)
 BWV 847 – Prelude and Fugue in C minor
 BWV 847a – Prelude in C minor (alternative version of BWV 847, only Prelude)
 BWV 848 – Prelude and Fugue in C-sharp major
 BWV 849 – Prelude and Fugue in C-sharp minor
 BWV 850 – Prelude and Fugue in D major
 BWV 850a – Prelude in D major (alternative version of BWV 850, only Prelude)
 BWV 851 – Prelude and Fugue in D minor
 BWV 851a – Prelude in D minor (alternative version of BWV 851, only Prelude)
 BWV 852 – Prelude and Fugue in E-flat major
 BWV 853 – Prelude and Fugue in E-flat minor (The fugue of this work is in D-sharp minor, the enharmonic key of E-flat minor)
 BWV 854 – Prelude and Fugue in E major
 BWV 855 – Prelude and Fugue in E minor
 BWV 855a – Prelude in E minor (early version of the prelude of BWV 855), and Fughetta
 BWV 856 – Prelude and Fugue in F major
 BWV 857 – Prelude and Fugue in F minor
 BWV 858 – Prelude and Fugue in F-sharp major
 BWV 859 – Prelude and Fugue in F-sharp minor
 BWV 860 – Prelude and Fugue in G major
 BWV 861 – Prelude and Fugue in G minor
 BWV 862 – Prelude and Fugue in A-flat major
 BWV 863 – Prelude and Fugue in G-sharp minor
 BWV 864 – Prelude and Fugue in A major
 BWV 865 – Prelude and Fugue in A minor
 BWV 866 – Prelude and Fugue in B-flat major
 BWV 867 – Prelude and Fugue in B-flat minor
 BWV 868 – Prelude and Fugue in B major
 BWV 869 – Prelude and Fugue in B minor
The Well-Tempered Clavier, Book II:
 BWV 870 – Prelude and Fugue in C major
 BWV 870a – Prelude and Fugue in C major (alternative version of BWV 870)
 BWV 870b – Prelude in C major (alternative version of BWV 870)
 BWV 871 – Prelude and Fugue in C minor
 BWV 872 – Prelude and Fugue in C-sharp major
 BWV 872a – Prelude and Fugue in C-sharp major (alternative version of BWV 872)
 BWV 873 – Prelude and Fugue in C-sharp minor
 BWV 874 – Prelude and Fugue in D major
 BWV 875 – Prelude and Fugue in D minor
 BWV 875a – Prelude in D minor (alternative version of BWV 875)
 BWV 876 – Prelude and Fugue in E-flat major
 BWV 877 – Prelude and Fugue in D-sharp minor
 BWV 878 – Prelude and Fugue in E major
 BWV 879 – Prelude and Fugue in E minor
 BWV 880 – Prelude and Fugue in F major
 BWV 881 – Prelude and Fugue in F minor
 BWV 882 – Prelude and Fugue in F-sharp major
 BWV 883 – Prelude and Fugue in F-sharp minor
 BWV 884 – Prelude and Fugue in G major
 BWV 885 – Prelude and Fugue in G minor
 BWV 886 – Prelude and Fugue in A-flat major
 BWV 887 – Prelude and Fugue in G-sharp minor
 BWV 888 – Prelude and Fugue in A major
 BWV 889 – Prelude and Fugue in A minor
 BWV 890 – Prelude and Fugue in B-flat major
 BWV 891 – Prelude and Fugue in B-flat minor
 BWV 892 – Prelude and Fugue in B major
 BWV 893 – Prelude and Fugue in B minor

Preludes and fugues, toccatas and fantasias (894–923)

 BWV 894 – Prelude and Fugue in A minor
 BWV 895 – Prelude and Fugue in A minor
 BWV 896 – Prelude and Fugue in A major
 BWV 897 – Prelude and Fugue in A minor (doubtful; prelude possibly by Cornelius Heinrich Dretzel, fugue possibly by Wilhelm Friedemann Bach)
 BWV 898 – Prelude and Fugue in B-flat major on the name B-A-C-H (doubtful)
 BWV 899 – Prelude and Fughetta in D minor
 BWV 900 – Prelude and Fughetta in E minor
 BWV 901 – Prelude and Fughetta in F major
 BWV 902 – Prelude and Fughetta in G major
 BWV 902a – Prelude in G major (alternative version of BWV 902)
 BWV 903 – Chromatic Fantasia and Fugue in D minor
 BWV 903a – Chromatic Fantasia in D minor (alternative version of BWV 903)
 BWV 904 – Fantasia and Fugue in A minor
 BWV 905 – Fantasia and Fugue in D minor (doubtful)
 BWV 906 – Fantasia and Fugue in C minor (fugue unfinished)
 BWV 907 – Fantasia and Fughetta in B-flat major (doubtful)
 BWV 908 – Fantasia and Fughetta in D major (doubtful)
 BWV 909 – Concerto and Fugue in C minor (doubtful)
 BWV 910 – Toccata in F-sharp minor
 BWV 911 – Toccata in C minor
 BWV 912 – Toccata in D major
 BWV 913 – Toccata in D minor
 BWV 914 – Toccata in E minor
 BWV 915 – Toccata in G minor
 BWV 916 – Toccata in G major
 BWV 917 – Fantasia in G minor
 BWV 918 – Fantasia in C minor
 BWV 919 – Fantasia in C minor (doubtful, possibly by Johann Bernhard Bach)
 BWV 920 – Fantasia in G minor (doubtful)
 BWV 921 – Prelude in C minor
 BWV 922 – Prelude (Fantasia) in A minor
 BWV 923 – Prelude in B minor (possibly by Wilhelm Hieronymus Pachelbel)
 BWV 923a – Prelude (Toccatina No. 3; variant of BWV 923; doubtful)

Nine Little Preludes from Wilhelm Friedemann Bach's Klavierbüchlein (924–932)

Indicated as "Neun kleine Präludien aus dem Klavierbüchlein für Wilhelm Friedemann Bach" (nine little preludes from the keyboard-booklet for Wilhelm Friedemann Bach) in the Bach-Werke Verzeichnis:
 BWV 924 – Prelude in C major (Klavierbüchlein No. 2: "Praeambulum") BWV 924a – Prelude in C major (Klavierbüchlein No. 26: "Preludium ex c♮"; variant version of BWV 924 probably by W. F. Bach)
 BWV 925 – Prelude in D major (Klavierbüchlein No. 27: "Praeludium ex d♮"; possibly by W. F. Bach)
 BWV 926 – Prelude in D minor (Klavierbüchlein No. 4: "Praeludium")
 BWV 927 – Prelude in F major (Klavierbüchlein No. 8: "Praeambulum")
 BWV 928 – Prelude in F major (Klavierbüchlein No. 10: "Praeludium")
 BWV 929 – Prelude in G minor (Klavierbüchlein No. 48e: Trio for a Minuet by Gottfried Heinrich Stölzel)
 BWV 930 – Prelude in G minor (Klavierbüchlein No. 9: "Praeambulum")
 BWV 931 – Prelude in A minor (Klavierbüchlein No. 29: "Praeludium"; possibly by W. F. Bach)
 BWV 932 – Prelude in E minor (incomplete; Klavierbüchlein No. 28: "Praeludium ex e♭"; possibly by W. F. Bach)

Six Little Preludes (933–938)

An 18th-century set of short preludes by Johann Sebastian Bach:
 BWV 933 – Little Prelude in C major
 BWV 934 – Little Prelude in C minor
 BWV 935 – Little Prelude in D minor
 BWV 936 – Little Prelude in D major
 BWV 937 – Little Prelude in E major
 BWV 938 – Little Prelude in E minor

Five Little Preludes (939–943)

Five short preludes found in the manuscript P 804 (collection of Johann Peter Kellner):
 BWV 939 – Prelude in C major
 BWV 940 – Prelude in D minor
 BWV 941 – Prelude in E minor
 BWV 942 – Prelude in A minor
 BWV 943 – Prelude in C major

Fugues and fughettas (944–962)

 BWV 944 – Fantasia and Fugue in A minor
 BWV 945 – Fugue in E minor (doubtful, possibly by Christoph Graupner)
 BWV 946 – Fugue in C major
 BWV 947 – Fugue in A minor
 BWV 948 – Fugue in D minor
 BWV 949 – Fugue in A major
 BWV 950 – Fugue in A major on a theme by Tomaso Albinoni
 BWV 951 – Fugue in B minor on a theme by Tomaso Albinoni
 BWV 951a – Fugue in B minor (alternative version of BWV 951)
 BWV 952 – Fugue in C major
 BWV 953 – Fugue in C major
 BWV 954 – Fugue in B-flat major on a theme by Johann Adam Reincken
 BWV 955 – Fugue in B-flat major
 BWV 956 – Fugue in E minor (doubtful)
 BWV 957 – Machs mit mir, Gott, nach deiner Güt (chorale prelude for organ in the Neumeister Collection, previously listed as Fugue in G major)
 BWV 958 – Fugue in A minor (doubtful)
 BWV 959 – Fugue in A minor
 BWV 960 – Fugue in E minor (incomplete and doubtful)
 BWV 961 – Fughetta in C minor
 BWV 962 – Fughetta in E minor (spurious, composed by Johann Georg Albrechtsberger)

Sonatas and sonata movements (963–970)
 BWV 963 – Sonata in D major
 BWV 964 – Sonata in D minor (arrangement of Sonata No. 2 for solo violin, BWV 1003 – doubtful)
 BWV 965 – Sonata in A minor (after Johann Adam Reincken's Hortus Musicus, Nos. 1–5)
 BWV 966 – Sonata in C major (after Johann Adam Reincken's Hortus Musicus, Nos. 11–15)
 BWV 967 – Sonata in A minor (one movement only, arrangement of a chamber sonata by unknown composer)
 BWV 968 – Adagio in G major (after movement 1 of Sonata No. 3 for solo violin, BWV 1005 – doubtful)
 BWV 969 – Andante in G minor (doubtful)
 BWV 970 – Presto in D minor (spurious, composed by Wilhelm Friedemann Bach)

Italian Concerto, from Clavier-Übung II (971)
 BWV 971 – Italian Concerto, in F major

Keyboard arrangements of concerti by other composers (972–987)

 BWV 972 – Concerto in D major (arrangement of Antonio Vivaldi's Concerto Op. 3/9, RV230)
 BWV 973 – Concerto in G major (arrangement of Antonio Vivaldi's Concerto Op. 7/8, RV299)
 BWV 974 – Concerto in D minor (arrangement of Alessandro Marcello's Oboe Concerto in D minor)
 BWV 975 – Concerto in G minor (arrangement of Antonio Vivaldi's Concerto Op. 4/6, RV316a)
 BWV 976 – Concerto in C major (arrangement of Antonio Vivaldi's Concerto Op. 3/12, RV265)
 BWV 977 – Concerto in C major (source unknown, possibly a concerto by Benedetto Marcello)
 BWV 978 – Concerto in F major (arrangement of Antonio Vivaldi's Concerto Op. 3/3, RV310)
 BWV 979 – Concerto in B minor (recently identified as Vivaldi's Concerto RV Anh. 10, now RV 813)
 BWV 980 – Concerto in G major (arrangement of Antonio Vivaldi's ''Violin Concerto in B-flat Major, RV 381)
 BWV 981 – Concerto in C minor (possibly an arrangement of Benedetto Marcello's concerto Op. 1/2)
 BWV 982 – Concerto in B-flat major (arrangement of Prince Johann Ernst of Saxe-Weimar's concerto Op. 1/1)
 BWV 983 – Concerto in G minor (source unknown)
 BWV 984 – Concerto in C major (arrangement of a Prince Johann Ernst concerto) (see BWV 595 for organ version)
 BWV 985 – Concerto in G minor (arrangement of a Georg Philipp Telemann violin concerto)
 BWV 986 – Concerto in G major (arrangement of a concerto attributed to Georg Philipp Telemann)
 BWV 987 – Concerto in D minor (arrangement of Prince Johann Ernst's concerto Op. 1/4)

Variations and miscellaneous pieces for keyboard (988–994)

 BWV 988 – Goldberg Variations (published as Fourth Clavier-Übung)
 BWV 989 – Aria variata alla maniera italiana, in A minor
 BWV 990 – Sarabande con Partite in C major (loosely adapted from the overture for "Bellérophon" (1679) by Jean-Baptiste Lully – doubtful)
 BWV 991 – Air with variations in C minor (unfinished, from the 1722 Notebook for Anna Magdalena Bach)
 BWV 992 – Capriccio sopra la lontananza del suo fratello dilettissimo ("Capriccio on the departure of the Beloved Brother"), in B-flat major
 BWV 993 – Capriccio in E major
 BWV 994 – Applicatio in C major (from the Clavier-Büchlein for Wilhelm Friedemann Bach)

Works for solo lute (BWV 995–1000)

 BWV 995 – Suite in G minor (transcription of Cello Suite No. 5, BWV 1011)
 BWV 996 – Suite in E minor (most probably intended for lute-harpsichord)
 BWV 997 – Suite in C minor
 BWV 998 – Prelude, Fugue and Allegro in E-flat major
 BWV 999 – Prelude in C minor
 BWV 1000 – Fugue in G minor (transcription of Fuga (Allegro) from Violin Sonata No. 1 in G minor, BWV 1001)

Works for keyboard and lute in the eighth and ninth chapters of the Bach-Werke-Verzeichnis (1998)

|- id="BWV Chapter 8" style="background: #D8D8D8;"
| data-sort-value="0771.z99" | 8.
| data-sort-value="356.001" colspan="8" | Keyboard compositions (see also: List of solo keyboard compositions by Johann Sebastian Bach)
| data-sort-value="0901a" | Up ↑
|- id="Inventions BWV 772–786" style="background: #E3F6CE;"
| data-sort-value="0772.000" | 772
| data-sort-value="356.002" | 8.
| data-sort-value="1722-12-31" | 1720-01-221725-01-22
| data-sort-value="Inventions and Sinfonias No. 01" | Inventions and Sinfonias No. 1 – Invention No. 1 = WFB No. 32: Preamb. 1
| C maj.
| Keyboard
| data-sort-value="000.03: 001" | 3: 1451: 221
| data-sort-value="V/05: 048 V/03: 002" | V/5: 48V/3: 2
| data-sort-value="→ BWV 0772a" | → BWV 772a
| 
|- style="background: #E3F6CE;"
| data-sort-value="0772.A00" | 772a
| data-sort-value="356.003" | 8.
| data-sort-value="1722-12-31" | 1720-01-221725-01-22
| data-sort-value="Inventions and Sinfonias No. 01a" | Inventions and Sinfonias No. 1a – Invention No. 1a
| C maj.
| Keyboard
| data-sort-value="000.03: 342" | 3: 342
| data-sort-value="V/03: 004" | V/3: 4
| data-sort-value="after BWV 0772" | after BWV 772
| 
|- style="background: #E3F6CE;"
| data-sort-value="0773.000" | 773
| data-sort-value="356.004" | 8.
| data-sort-value="1722-12-31" | 1720-01-221725-01-22
| data-sort-value="Inventions and Sinfonias No. 02" | Inventions and Sinfonias No. 2 – Invention No. 2 = WFB No. 46: Preamb. 15
| C min.
| Keyboard
| data-sort-value="000.03: 002" | 3: 2451: 223
| data-sort-value="V/05: 076 V/03: 006" | V/5: 76V/3: 6
| 
| 
|- style="background: #E3F6CE;"
| data-sort-value="0774.000" | 774
| data-sort-value="356.005" | 8.
| data-sort-value="1722-12-31" | 1720-01-221725-01-22
| data-sort-value="Inventions and Sinfonias No. 03" | Inventions and Sinfonias No. 3 – Invention No. 3 = WFB No. 45: Preamb. 14
| D maj.
| Keyboard
| data-sort-value="000.03: 003" | 3: 3451: 223
| data-sort-value="V/05: 074 V/03: 008" | V/5: 74V/3: 8
| 
| 
|- style="background: #E3F6CE;"
| data-sort-value="0775.000" | 775
| data-sort-value="356.006" | 8.
| data-sort-value="1722-12-31" | 1720-01-221725-01-22
| data-sort-value="Inventions and Sinfonias No. 04" | Inventions and Sinfonias No. 4 – Invention No. 4 = WFB No. 33: Preamb. 2
| D min.
| Keyboard
| data-sort-value="000.03: 004" | 3: 4451: 221
| data-sort-value="V/05: 050 V/03: 010" | V/5: 50V/3: 10
| 
| 
|- style="background: #E3F6CE;"
| data-sort-value="0776.000" | 776
| data-sort-value="356.007" | 8.
| data-sort-value="1722-12-31" | 1720-01-221725-01-22
| data-sort-value="Inventions and Sinfonias No. 05" | Inventions and Sinfonias No. 5 – Invention No. 5 = WFB No. 44: Preamb. 13
| E♭ maj.
| Keyboard
| data-sort-value="000.03: 006" | 3: 6451: 222
| data-sort-value="V/05: 072 V/03: 012" | V/5: 72V/3: 12
| 
| 
|- style="background: #E3F6CE;"
| data-sort-value="0777.000" | 777
| data-sort-value="356.008" | 8.
| data-sort-value="1722-12-31" | 1720-01-221725-01-22
| data-sort-value="Inventions and Sinfonias No. 06" | Inventions and Sinfonias No. 6 – Invention No. 6 = WFB No. 43: Preamb. 12
| E maj.
| Keyboard
| data-sort-value="000.03: 007" | 3: 7451: 222
| data-sort-value="V/05: 070 V/03: 014" | V/5: 70V/3: 14
| 
| 
|- style="background: #E3F6CE;"
| data-sort-value="0778.000" | 778
| data-sort-value="356.009" | 8.
| data-sort-value="1722-12-31" | 1720-01-221725-01-22
| data-sort-value="Inventions and Sinfonias No. 07" | Inventions and Sinfonias No. 7 – Invention No. 7 = WFB No. 34: Preamb. 3
| E min.
| Keyboard
| data-sort-value="000.03: 009" | 3: 9451: 221
| data-sort-value="V/05: 052 V/03: 016" | V/5: 52V/3: 16
| 
| 
|- style="background: #E3F6CE;"
| data-sort-value="0779.000" | 779
| data-sort-value="356.010" | 8.
| data-sort-value="1722-12-31" | 1720-01-221725-01-22
| data-sort-value="Inventions and Sinfonias No. 08" | Inventions and Sinfonias No. 8 – Invention No. 8 = WFB No. 35: Preamb. 4
| F maj.
| Keyboard
| data-sort-value="000.03: 010" | 3: 10451: 221
| data-sort-value="V/05: 054 V/03: 018" | V/5: 54V/3: 18
| 
| 
|- style="background: #E3F6CE;"
| data-sort-value="0780.000" | 780
| data-sort-value="356.011" | 8.
| data-sort-value="1722-12-31" | 1720-01-221725-01-22
| data-sort-value="Inventions and Sinfonias No. 09" | Inventions and Sinfonias No. 9 – Invention No. 9 = WFB No. 42: Preamb. 11
| F min.
| Keyboard
| data-sort-value="000.03: 011" | 3: 11451: 222
| data-sort-value="V/05: 068 V/03: 020" | V/5: 68V/3: 20
| 
| 
|- style="background: #E3F6CE;"
| data-sort-value="0781.000" | 781
| data-sort-value="356.012" | 8.
| data-sort-value="1722-12-31" | 1720-01-221725-01-22
| data-sort-value="Inventions and Sinfonias No. 10" | Inventions and Sinfonias No. 10 – Invention No. 10 = WFB No. 36: Preamb. 5
| G maj.
| Keyboard
| data-sort-value="000.03: 012" | 3: 12451: 221
| data-sort-value="V/05: 056 V/03: 022" | V/5: 56V/3: 22
| 
| 
|- style="background: #E3F6CE;"
| data-sort-value="0782.000" | 782
| data-sort-value="356.013" | 8.
| data-sort-value="1722-12-31" | 1720-01-221725-01-22
| data-sort-value="Inventions and Sinfonias No. 11" | Inventions and Sinfonias No. 11 – Invention No. 11 = WFB No. 41: Preamb. 10
| G min.
| Keyboard
| data-sort-value="000.03: 013" | 3: 13451: 222
| data-sort-value="V/05: 066 V/03: 024" | V/5: 66V/3: 24
| 
| 
|- style="background: #E3F6CE;"
| data-sort-value="0783.000" | 783
| data-sort-value="356.014" | 8.
| data-sort-value="1722-12-31" | 1720-01-221725-01-22
| data-sort-value="Inventions and Sinfonias No. 12" | Inventions and Sinfonias No. 12 – Invention No. 12 = WFB No. 40: Preamb. 9
| A maj.
| Keyboard
| data-sort-value="000.03: 014" | 3: 14451: 222
| data-sort-value="V/05: 064 V/03: 026" | V/5: 64V/3: 26
| 
| 
|- style="background: #E3F6CE;"
| data-sort-value="0784.000" | 784
| data-sort-value="356.015" | 8.
| data-sort-value="1722-12-31" | 1720-01-221725-01-22
| data-sort-value="Inventions and Sinfonias No. 13" | Inventions and Sinfonias No. 13 – Invention No. 13 = WFB No. 37: Preamb. 6
| A min.
| Keyboard
| data-sort-value="000.03: 015" | 3: 15451: 221
| data-sort-value="V/05: 058 V/03: 028" | V/5: 58V/3: 28
| 
| 
|- style="background: #E3F6CE;"
| data-sort-value="0785.000" | 785
| data-sort-value="356.016" | 8.
| data-sort-value="1722-12-31" | 1720-01-221725-01-22
| data-sort-value="Inventions and Sinfonias No. 14" | Inventions and Sinfonias No. 14 – Invention No. 14 = WFB No. 39: Preamb. 8
| B♭ maj.
| Keyboard
| data-sort-value="000.03: 016" | 3: 16451: 222
| data-sort-value="V/05: 062 V/03: 030" | V/5: 62V/3: 30
| 
| 
|- style="background: #E3F6CE;"
| data-sort-value="0786.000" | 786
| data-sort-value="356.017" | 8.
| data-sort-value="1722-12-31" | 1720-01-221725-01-22
| data-sort-value="Inventions and Sinfonias No. 15" | Inventions and Sinfonias No. 15 – Invention No. 15 = WFB No. 38: Preamb. 7
| B min.
| Keyboard
| data-sort-value="000.03: 018" | 3: 18451: 222
| data-sort-value="V/05: 060 V/03: 032" | V/5: 60V/3: 32
| 
| 
|- id="Sinfonias BWV 787–801" style="background: #E3F6CE;"
| data-sort-value="0787.000" | 787
| data-sort-value="356.018" | 8.
| data-sort-value="1722-12-31" | 1720-01-221725-01-22
| data-sort-value="Sinfonias and Inventions No. 16" | Sinfonias and Inventions No. 16 – Sinfonia No. 1 = WFB No. 49: Fantasia 1
| C maj.
| Keyboard
| data-sort-value="000.03: 019" | 3: 19451: 227
| data-sort-value="V/05: 090 V/03: 034" | V/5: 90V/3: 34
| 
| 
|- style="background: #E3F6CE;"
| data-sort-value="0788.000" | 788
| data-sort-value="356.019" | 8.
| data-sort-value="1722-12-31" | 1720-01-221725-01-22
| data-sort-value="Sinfonias and Inventions No. 17" | Sinfonias and Inventions No. 17 – Sinfonia No. 2 = WFB No. 63: Fantasia 15
| C min.
| Keyboard
| data-sort-value="000.03: 020" | 3: 20451: 231
| data-sort-value="V/05: 118 V/03: 036" | V/5: 118V/3: 36
| 
| 
|- style="background: #E3F6CE;"
| data-sort-value="0789.000" | 789
| data-sort-value="356.020" | 8.
| data-sort-value="1722-12-31" | 1720-01-221725-01-22
| data-sort-value="Sinfonias and Inventions No. 18" | Sinfonias and Inventions No. 18 – Sinfonia No. 3 = WFB No. 62: Fantasia 14
| D maj.
| Keyboard
| data-sort-value="000.03: 022" | 3: 22451: 230
| data-sort-value="V/05: 116 V/03: 038" | V/5: 116V/3: 38
| 
| 
|- style="background: #E3F6CE;"
| data-sort-value="0790.000" | 790
| data-sort-value="356.021" | 8.
| data-sort-value="1722-12-31" | 1720-01-221725-01-22
| data-sort-value="Sinfonias and Inventions No. 19" | Sinfonias and Inventions No. 19 – Sinfonia No. 4 = WFB No. 50: Fantasia 2
| D min.
| Keyboard
| data-sort-value="000.03: 023" | 3: 23451: 227
| data-sort-value="V/05: 092 V/03: 040" | V/5: 92V/3: 40
| 
| 
|- style="background: #E3F6CE;"
| data-sort-value="0791.000" | 791
| data-sort-value="356.022" | 8.
| data-sort-value="1722-12-31" | 1720-01-221725-01-22
| data-sort-value="Sinfonias and Inventions No. 20" | Sinfonias and Inventions No. 20 – Sinfonia No. 5 = WFB No. 61: Fantasia 13
| E♭ maj.
| Keyboard
| data-sort-value="000.03: 024" | 3: 24451: 230
| data-sort-value="V/05: 114 V/03: 042" | V/5: 114V/3: 42
| data-sort-value="→ BWV 0791a" | → BWV 791a
| 
|- style="background: #E3F6CE;"
| data-sort-value="0791.A00" | 791a
| data-sort-value="356.023" | 8.
| data-sort-value="1723-07-01" | 1723
| data-sort-value="Sinfonias and Inventions No. 20a" | Sinfonias and Inventions No. 20a – Sinfonia No. 5a
| E♭ maj.
| Keyboard
| 
| data-sort-value="V/03: 044, 080" | V/3: 44, 80
| data-sort-value="after BWV 0791" | after BWV 791
| 
|- style="background: #E3F6CE;"
| data-sort-value="0792.000" | 792
| data-sort-value="356.024" | 8.
| data-sort-value="1722-12-31" | 1720-01-221725-01-22
| data-sort-value="Sinfonias and Inventions No. 21" | Sinfonias and Inventions No. 21 – Sinfonia No. 6 = WFB No. 60: Fantasia 12
| E maj.
| Keyboard
| data-sort-value="000.03: 026" | 3: 26451: 229
| data-sort-value="V/05: 112 V/03: 046" | V/5: 112V/3: 46
| 
| 
|- style="background: #E3F6CE;"
| data-sort-value="0793.000" | 793
| data-sort-value="356.025" | 8.
| data-sort-value="1722-12-31" | 1720-01-221725-01-22
| data-sort-value="Sinfonias and Inventions No. 22" | Sinfonias and Inventions No. 22 – Sinfonia No. 7 = WFB No. 51: Fantasia 3
| E min.
| Keyboard
| data-sort-value="000.03: 028" | 3: 28451: 227
| data-sort-value="V/05: 094 V/03: 048" | V/5: 94V/3: 48
| 
| 
|- style="background: #E3F6CE;"
| data-sort-value="0794.000" | 794
| data-sort-value="356.026" | 8.
| data-sort-value="1722-12-31" | 1720-01-221725-01-22
| data-sort-value="Sinfonias and Inventions No. 23" | Sinfonias and Inventions No. 23 – Sinfonia No. 8 = WFB No. 52: Fantasia 4
| F maj.
| Keyboard
| data-sort-value="000.03: 029" | 3: 29451: 227
| data-sort-value="V/05: 096 V/03: 050" | V/5: 96V/3: 50
| 
| 
|- style="background: #E3F6CE;"
| data-sort-value="0795.000" | 795
| data-sort-value="356.027" | 8.
| data-sort-value="1722-12-31" | 1720-01-221725-01-22
| data-sort-value="Sinfonias and Inventions No. 24" | Sinfonias and Inventions No. 24 – Sinfonia No. 9 = WFB No. 59: Fantasia 11
| F min.
| Keyboard
| data-sort-value="000.03: 030" | 3: 30451: 229
| data-sort-value="V/05: 110 V/03: 052" | V/5: 110V/3: 52
| 
| 
|- style="background: #E3F6CE;"
| data-sort-value="0796.000" | 796
| data-sort-value="356.028" | 8.
| data-sort-value="1722-12-31" | 1720-01-221725-01-22
| data-sort-value="Sinfonias and Inventions No. 25" | Sinfonias and Inventions No. 25 – Sinfonia No. 10 = WFB No. 53: Fantasia 5
| G maj.
| Keyboard
| data-sort-value="000.03: 032" | 3: 32451: 228
| data-sort-value="V/05: 098 V/03: 054" | V/5: 98V/3: 54
| 
| 
|- style="background: #E3F6CE;"
| data-sort-value="0797.000" | 797
| data-sort-value="356.029" | 8.
| data-sort-value="1722-12-31" | 1720-01-221725-01-22
| data-sort-value="Sinfonias and Inventions No. 26" | Sinfonias and Inventions No. 26 – Sinfonia No. 11 = WFB No. 58: Fantasia 10
| G min.
| Keyboard
| data-sort-value="000.03: 034" | 3: 34451: 229
| data-sort-value="V/05: 108 V/03: 056" | V/5: 108V/3: 56
| 
| 
|- style="background: #E3F6CE;"
| data-sort-value="0798.000" | 798
| data-sort-value="356.030" | 8.
| data-sort-value="1722-12-31" | 1720-01-221725-01-22
| data-sort-value="Sinfonias and Inventions No. 27" | Sinfonias and Inventions No. 27 – Sinfonia No. 12 = WFB No. 57: Fantasia 9
| A maj.
| Keyboard
| data-sort-value="000.03: 036" | 3: 36451: 229
| data-sort-value="V/05: 106 V/03: 058" | V/5: 106V/3: 58
| 
| 
|- style="background: #E3F6CE;"
| data-sort-value="0799.000" | 799
| data-sort-value="356.031" | 8.
| data-sort-value="1722-12-31" | 1720-01-221725-01-22
| data-sort-value="Sinfonias and Inventions No. 28" | Sinfonias and Inventions No. 28 – Sinfonia No. 13 = WFB No. 54: Fantasia 6
| A min.
| Keyboard
| data-sort-value="000.03: 038" | 3: 38451: 228
| data-sort-value="V/05: 100 V/03: 060" | V/5: 100V/3: 60
| 
| 
|- style="background: #E3F6CE;"
| data-sort-value="0800.000" | 800
| data-sort-value="356.032" | 8.
| data-sort-value="1722-12-31" | 1720-01-221725-01-22
| data-sort-value="Sinfonias and Inventions No. 29" | Sinfonias and Inventions No. 29 – Sinfonia No. 14 = WFB No. 56: Fantasia 8
| B♭ maj.
| Keyboard
| data-sort-value="000.03: 040" | 3: 40451: 228
| data-sort-value="V/05: 104 V/03: 062" | V/5: 104V/3: 62
| 
| 
|- style="background: #E3F6CE;"
| data-sort-value="0801.000" | 801
| data-sort-value="356.033" | 8.
| data-sort-value="1722-12-31" | 1720-01-221725-01-22
| data-sort-value="Sinfonias and Inventions No. 30" | Sinfonias and Inventions No. 30 – Sinfonia No. 15 = WFB No. 55: Fantasia 7
| B min.
| Keyboard
| data-sort-value="000.03: 041" | 3: 41451: 228
| data-sort-value="V/05: 102 V/03: 064" | V/5: 102V/3: 64
| 
| 
|- style="background: #E3F6CE;"
| data-sort-value="0802.000" | 802
| data-sort-value="358.003" | 8.
| data-sort-value="1739-07-01" | 1739
| Duet No. 1 from Clavier-Übung III
| E min.
| Organ
| data-sort-value="000.03: 242" | 3: 242
| data-sort-value="IV/04: 092" | IV/4: 92
| 
| 
|- style="background: #E3F6CE;"
| data-sort-value="0803.000" | 803
| data-sort-value="358.004" | 8.
| data-sort-value="1739-07-01" | 1739
| Duet No. 2 from Clavier-Übung III
| F maj.
| Organ
| data-sort-value="000.03: 243" | 3: 245
| data-sort-value="IV/04: 096" | IV/4: 96
| 
| 
|- style="background: #E3F6CE;"
| data-sort-value="0804.000" | 804
| data-sort-value="358.005" | 8.
| data-sort-value="1739-07-01" | 1739
| Duet No. 3 from Clavier-Übung III
| G maj.
| Organ
| data-sort-value="000.03: 244" | 3: 248
| data-sort-value="IV/04: 099" | IV/4: 99
| 
| 
|- style="background: #E3F6CE;"
| data-sort-value="0805.000" | 805
| data-sort-value="358.006" | 8.
| data-sort-value="1739-07-01" | 1739
| Duet No. 4 from Clavier-Übung III
| A min.
| Organ
| data-sort-value="000.03: 245" | 3: 251
| data-sort-value="IV/04: 102" | IV/4: 102
| 
| 
|- style="background: #F6E3CE;"
| data-sort-value="0806.000" | 806
| data-sort-value="358.007" | 8.
| data-sort-value="1718-12-31" | 1714–1723
| English Suites, No. 1
| A maj.
| Keyboard
| data-sort-value="000.45 1: 003" | 451: 3132: 3
| data-sort-value="V/07: 002" | V/7: 2
| 
| 
|- style="background: #F6E3CE;"
| data-sort-value="0806a.000" | 806a
| data-sort-value="358.008" | 8.
| data-sort-value="1715-12-31" | 1714–1717
| English Suites, No. 1a
| A maj.
| Keyboard
| 
| data-sort-value="V/07: 116" | V/7: 116
| 
| 
|- style="background: #F6E3CE;"
| data-sort-value="0807.000" | 807
| data-sort-value="358.009" | 8.
| data-sort-value="1720-12-31" | 1725 or earlier
| English Suites, No. 2
| A min.
| Keyboard
| data-sort-value="000.45 1: 004" | 451: 16132: 16
| data-sort-value="V/07: 020" | V/7: 20
| 
| 
|- style="background: #F6E3CE;"
| data-sort-value="0808.000" | 808
| data-sort-value="358.010" | 8.
| data-sort-value="1720-12-31" | 1725 or earlier
| English Suites, No. 3
| G min.
| Keyboard
| data-sort-value="000.45 1: 005" | 451: 30132: 30
| data-sort-value="V/07: 038" | V/7: 38
| 
| 
|- style="background: #F6E3CE;"
| data-sort-value="0809.000" | 809
| data-sort-value="358.011" | 8.
| data-sort-value="1720-12-31" | 1725 or earlier
| English Suites, No. 4
| F maj.
| Keyboard
| data-sort-value="000.45 1: 006" | 451: 41132: 41
| data-sort-value="V/07: 054" | V/7: 54
| 
| 
|- style="background: #F6E3CE;"
| data-sort-value="0810.000" | 810
| data-sort-value="358.012" | 8.
| data-sort-value="1720-12-31" | 1725 or earlier
| English Suites, No. 5
| E min.
| Keyboard
| data-sort-value="000.45 1: 007" | 451: 53132: 53
| data-sort-value="V/07: 070" | V/7: 70
| 
| 
|- style="background: #F6E3CE;"
| data-sort-value="0811.000" | 811
| data-sort-value="358.013" | 8.
| data-sort-value="1720-12-31" | 1725 or earlier
| English Suites, No. 6
| D min.
| Keyboard
| data-sort-value="000.45 1: 008" | 451: 68132: 68
| data-sort-value="V/07: 090" | V/7: 90
| 
| 
|- id="AMB1722" style="background: #E3F6CE;"
| data-sort-value="0812.000" rowspan="4" | 812
| data-sort-value="362.003" rowspan="4" | 8.
| data-sort-value="1722-07-01" rowspan="4" | 1722 or earlier
| data-sort-value="Notebook A. M. Bach (1722) No. 01" | Notebook A. M. Bach (1722) No. 1 – French Suites, No. 1
| rowspan="4" | D min.
| rowspan="4" | Keyboard
| data-sort-value="000.43 2: 000VIa" | 432: VI
| data-sort-value="V/04: 003" | V/4: 3
| rowspan="4" | 
| rowspan="4" | 
|- style="background: #E3F6CE;"
| data-sort-value="Notebook A. M. Bach (1725) No. 30" | Notebook A. M. Bach (1725) No. 30 – French Suites, No. 1
| data-sort-value="000.43 2: 040" | 432: 40
| data-sort-value="V/04: 109" | V/4: 109
|- style="background: #E3F6CE;"
| French Suites, No. 1 – Version A (Altnickol)
| data-sort-value="000.45 1: 089" rowspan="2" | 451: 89132: 89
| data-sort-value="V/08: 002" | V/8: 2
|- style="background: #E3F6CE;"
| French Suites, No. 1 – Version B (early version)
| data-sort-value="V/08: 064" | V/8: 64
|- style="background: #E3F6CE;"
| data-sort-value="0813.000" rowspan="5" | 813
| data-sort-value="362.007" rowspan="5" | 8.
| data-sort-value="1723-12-31" rowspan="5" | 
| data-sort-value="Notebook A. M. Bach (1722) No. 02" | Notebook A. M. Bach (1722) No. 2 – French Suites, No. 2
| rowspan="5" | C min.
| rowspan="5" | Keyboard
| data-sort-value="000.43 2: 000VIb" | 432: VI
| data-sort-value="V/04: 010" | V/4: 10, 42
| rowspan="5" | 
| rowspan="5" | 
|- style="background: #E3F6CE;"
| data-sort-value="Notebook A. M. Bach (1725) No. 31" | Notebook A. M. Bach (1725) No. 31 – French Suites, No. 2
| data-sort-value="000.43 2: 044" | 432: 44
| data-sort-value="V/04: 116" | V/4: 116
|- style="background: #E3F6CE;"
| French Suites, No. 2 – Version A (Altnickol)
| data-sort-value="000.45 1: 094" rowspan="2" | 451: 94132: 94
| data-sort-value="V/08: 010" | V/8: 10
|- style="background: #E3F6CE;"
| rowspan="2" | French Suites, No. 2 – Version B (early version)
| rowspan="2" data-sort-value="V/08: 072" | V/8: 72
|- style="background: #E3F6CE;"
| data-sort-value="000.36: 236" | 36: 236
|- style="background: #E3F6CE;"
| data-sort-value="0814.000" rowspan="3" | 814
| data-sort-value="362.011" rowspan="3" | 8.
| data-sort-value="1723-12-31" rowspan="3" | 
| data-sort-value="Notebook A. M. Bach (1722) No. 03" | Notebook A. M. Bach (1722) No. 3 – French Suites, No. 3
| rowspan="3" | B min.
| rowspan="3" | Keyboard
| data-sort-value="000.43 2: 000VIIa" | 432: VII
| data-sort-value="V/04: 016" | V/4: 16, 43
| rowspan="3" | → BWV 814a
| rowspan="3" | 
|- style="background: #E3F6CE;"
| French Suites, No. 3 – Version A (Altnickol)
| data-sort-value="000.45 1: 100" rowspan="2" | 451: 100132: 100
| data-sort-value="V/08: 020" | V/8: 20
|- style="background: #E3F6CE;"
| French Suites, No. 3 – Version B (early version)
| data-sort-value="V/08: 082" | V/8: 82
|-
| data-sort-value="0814.A00" | 814a
| data-sort-value="362.014" | 8.
| data-sort-value="1729-12-31" | 
| French Suites, No. 3 – Variant
| B min.
| Keyboard
| data-sort-value="000.45 1: 100" | 451: 10036: 237132: 100
| data-sort-value="V/08: 166" | V/8: 166
| data-sort-value="after BWV 0814/1" | after BWV 814/1–/5, 929, 814/7
| 
|- style="background: #E3F6CE;"
| data-sort-value="0815.000" rowspan="4" | 815
| data-sort-value="362.015" rowspan="4" | 8.
| data-sort-value="1723-12-31" rowspan="4" | 
| data-sort-value="Notebook A. M. Bach (1722) No. 04" | Notebook A. M. Bach (1722) No. 4 French Suites, No. 4
| rowspan="4" | E♭ maj.
| rowspan="4" | Keyboard
| data-sort-value="000.43 2: 000VIIb" | 432: VII
| data-sort-value="V/04: 023" | V/4: 23
| rowspan="4" | → BWV 815a
| rowspan="4" | 
|- style="background: #E3F6CE;"
| French Suites, No. 4 – Version A (Altnickol)
| data-sort-value="000.45 1: 106" rowspan="2" | 451: 106132: 106
| data-sort-value="V/08: 030" | V/8: 30
|- style="background: #E3F6CE;"
| rowspan="2" | French Suites, No. 4 – Version B (early version)
| data-sort-value="V/08: 092" rowspan="2" | V/8: 92
|- style="background: #E3F6CE;"
| data-sort-value="000.36: 236" | 36: 236
|-
| data-sort-value="0815.A00" | 815a
| data-sort-value="362.018" | 8.
| data-sort-value="1725-12-31" |  or later
| French Suites, No. 4 – Variant
| E♭ maj.
| Keyboard
| data-sort-value="000.36: 234" | 36: 234451: 106132: 108
| data-sort-value="V/08: 176" | V/8: 176
| after BWV 815/1–/5
| 
|- style="background: #E3F6CE;"
| data-sort-value="0816.000" rowspan="3" | 816
| data-sort-value="362.019" rowspan="3" | 8.
| data-sort-value="1724-12-31" rowspan="3" | 
| data-sort-value="Notebook A. M. Bach (1722) No. 05" | Notebook A. M. Bach (1722) No. 5 French Suites, No. 5
| rowspan="3" | G maj.
| rowspan="3" | Keyboard
| data-sort-value="000.43 2: 000VIIc" | 432: VII
| data-sort-value="V/04: 030" | V/4: 30
| rowspan="3" | 
| rowspan="3" | 
|- style="background: #E3F6CE;"
| French Suites, No. 5 – Version A (Altnickol)
| data-sort-value="000.45 1: 112" rowspan="2" | 451: 112132: 112
| data-sort-value="V/08: 040" | V/8: 40
|- style="background: #E3F6CE;"
| French Suites, No. 5 – Version B (early version)
| data-sort-value="V/08: 102" | V/8: 102
|- style="background: #F5F6CE;"
| data-sort-value="0817.000" rowspan="2" | 817
| data-sort-value="362.022" rowspan="2" | 8.
| data-sort-value="1725-07-01" rowspan="2" | 1725 or later
| French Suites, No. 6 – Version A (Altnickol)
| rowspan="2" | E maj.
| rowspan="2" | Keyboard
| data-sort-value="000.45 1: 120" rowspan="2" | 451: 120132: 120
| data-sort-value="V/08: 052" | V/8: 52
| rowspan="2" | 
| rowspan="2" | 
|- style="background: #F5F6CE;"
| French Suites, No. 6 – Version B (early version)
| data-sort-value="V/08: 114" | V/8: 114
|-
| data-sort-value="0818.000" | 818
| data-sort-value="366.003" | 8.
| data-sort-value="1721-07-01" | 1720–1722
| Suite for keyboard (early version)
| A min.
| Keyboard
| data-sort-value="000.36: 003" | 36: 3
| data-sort-value="V/08: 129" | V/8: 129
| 
| 
|-
| data-sort-value="0818.A00" | 818a
| data-sort-value="366.004" | 8.
| data-sort-value="1723-07-01" | after 1721
| Suite for keyboard (later version)
| A min.
| Keyboard
| data-sort-value="000.36: 213" | 36: 213
| data-sort-value="V/08: 146" | V/8: 146
| 
| 
|-
| data-sort-value="0819.000" | 819
| data-sort-value="367.002" | 8.
| data-sort-value="1725-07-01" | before 1726
| Suite for keyboard (early version)
| E♭ maj.
| Keyboard
| data-sort-value="000.36: 008" | 36: 8
| data-sort-value="V/08: 136" | V/8: 136
| 
| 
|-
| data-sort-value="0819.A00" | 819a
| data-sort-value="367.003" | 8.
| data-sort-value="1726-12-31" | 1725–1728
| Suite for keyboard (later version)
| E♭ maj.
| Keyboard
| data-sort-value="000.36: 217" | 36: 217
| data-sort-value="V/08: 156" | V/8: 156
| 
| 
|-
| data-sort-value="0820.000" | 820
| data-sort-value="367.004" | 8.
| data-sort-value="1708-07-01" | 1705–1713
| Suite (Ouverture) for keyboard
| F maj.
| Keyboard
| data-sort-value="000.36: 014" | 36: 14
| data-sort-value="V/10: 043" | V/10: 43
| 
| 
|-
| data-sort-value="0822.000" | 822
| data-sort-value="368.003" | 8.
| 
| Suite for keyboard
| G min.
| Keyboard
| 
| data-sort-value="V/10: 068" | V/10: 68
| after unknown model?
| 
|-
| data-sort-value="0823.000" | 823
| data-sort-value="368.004" | 8.
| data-sort-value="1716-07-01" | before 1727
| Suite for keyboard
| F min.
| Keyboard
| data-sort-value="000.36: 229" | 36: 229
| data-sort-value="V/10: 050" | V/10: 50
| 
| 
|- id="NBA V-1" style="background: #E3F6CE;"
| data-sort-value="0825.000" | 825
| data-sort-value="369.004" | 8.
| data-sort-value="1725-12-31" | 1725–1726
| Partita No. 1 from Clavier-Übung I
| B♭ maj.
| Keyboard
| data-sort-value="000.03: 046" | 3: 46
| data-sort-value="V/01: 002" | V/1: 2
| 
| 
|- style="background: #E3F6CE;"
| data-sort-value="0826.000" | 826
| data-sort-value="369.005" | 8.
| data-sort-value="1726-07-01" | 1725–1727
| Partita No. 2 from Clavier-Übung I
| C min.
| Keyboard
| data-sort-value="000.03: 056" | 3: 56
| data-sort-value="V/01: 015" | V/1: 15
| 
| 
|- id="AMB1725" style="background: #E3F6CE;"
| data-sort-value="0827.000" | 827
| data-sort-value="369.006" | 8.
| data-sort-value="1726-07-01" | 1725–1727
| data-sort-value="Notebook A. M. Bach (1725) No. 01" | Notebook A. M. Bach (1725) No. 1 = Partita No. 3 from Clavier-Übung I
| A min.
| Keyboard
| data-sort-value="000.03: 070" | 3: 70
| data-sort-value="V/01: 035" | V/1: 35V/4: 47
| 
| 
|- style="background: #E3F6CE;"
| data-sort-value="0828.000" | 828
| data-sort-value="369.007" | 8.
| data-sort-value="1726-12-31" | 1725–1728
| Partita No. 4 from Clavier-Übung I
| D maj.
| Keyboard
| data-sort-value="000.03: 082" | 3: 82
| data-sort-value="V/01: 050" | V/1: 50
| 
| 
|- style="background: #E3F6CE;"
| data-sort-value="0829.000" | 829
| data-sort-value="369.008" | 8.
| data-sort-value="1727-12-31" | 1725–1730
| Partita No. 5 from Clavier-Übung I
| G maj.
| Keyboard
| data-sort-value="000.03: 102" | 3: 102
| data-sort-value="V/01: 072" | V/1: 72
| 
| 
|- style="background: #E3F6CE;"
| data-sort-value="0830.000" | 830
| data-sort-value="369.009" | 8.
| data-sort-value="1727-12-31" | 1725–1730
| data-sort-value="Notebook A. M. Bach (1725) No. 02" | Notebook A. M. Bach (1725) No. 2 = Partita No. 6 from Clavier-Übung I
| E min.
| Keyboard
| data-sort-value="000.03: 116" | 3: 116
| data-sort-value="V/01: 090" | V/1: 90V/4: 60
| after BWV 1019a/3 /5
| 
|- style="background: #E3F6CE;"
| data-sort-value="0831.000" | 831
| data-sort-value="372.002" | 8.
| data-sort-value="1734-07-01" | 1733–1735
| Overture in the French style (Clavier-Übung II No. 2)
| B min.
| Harpsichord
| data-sort-value="000.03: 154" | 3: 154
| data-sort-value="V/02: 020" | V/2: 20
| data-sort-value="after BWV 0831a" | after BWV 831a
| 
|- style="background: #E3F6CE;"
| data-sort-value="0831.A00" | 831a
| data-sort-value="372.003" | 8.
| data-sort-value="1730-07-01" | 1727–1733
| Overture in the French style (early version)
| C min.
| Keyboard
| 
| data-sort-value="V/02: 043" | V/2: 43
| data-sort-value="→ BWV 0831" | → BWV 831
| 
|- style="background: #F5F6CE;"
| data-sort-value="0832.000" | 832
| data-sort-value="373.001" | 8.
| data-sort-value="1706-07-01" | before 1707
| Suite for keyboard
| A maj.
| Keyboard
| data-sort-value="000.42: 255" | 42: 255
| data-sort-value="V/10: 054" | V/10: 54
| in Möllersche Handschrift
| 
|- style="background: #F5F6CE;"
| data-sort-value="0832.000" | 833
| data-sort-value="373.002" | 8.
| data-sort-value="1706-07-01" | before 1707
| Prelude and partita for keyboard
| F maj.
| Keyboard
| 
| data-sort-value="V/10: 060" | V/10: 60
| in Möllersche Handschrift
| 
|- style="background: #E3F6CE;"
| data-sort-value="0836.000" | 836
| data-sort-value="374.004" | 8.
| data-sort-value="1720-12-31" | 1720–1721
| Allemande, Klavierbüchlein WFB No. 6
| G min.
| Keyboard
| data-sort-value="000.45 1: 214" | 451: 214
| data-sort-value="V/05: 008" | V/5: 8
| by Bach, W. F. & J. S.?
| 
|- style="background: #E3F6CE;"
| data-sort-value="0837.000" | 837
| data-sort-value="374.005" | 8.
| data-sort-value="1720-12-31" | 1720–1721
| Allemande, Klavierbüchlein WFB No. 7 (incomplete)
| G min.
| Keyboard
| data-sort-value="000.45 1: 215" | 451: 215
| data-sort-value="V/05: 010" | V/5: 10
| by Bach, W. F. & J. S.?
| 
|- style="background: #F5F6CE;"
| data-sort-value="0841.000" | 841
| data-sort-value="374.009" | 8.
| data-sort-value="1720-12-31" | 1720–1721
| data-sort-value="Notebook A. M. Bach (1722) No. 11" | Notebook A. M. Bach (1722) No. 11 Menuet = WFB No. 11: Menuet 1
| G maj.
| Keyboard
| data-sort-value="000.36: 209 45 1: 215" | 36: 209451: 215
| data-sort-value="V/05: 016 V/04: 044" | V/5: 16 V/4: 44
| by Bach, W. F. & J. S.?
| 
|- style="background: #F5F6CE;"
| data-sort-value="0842.000" | 842
| data-sort-value="374.010" | 8.
| data-sort-value="1720-12-31" | 1720–1721
| Klavierbüchlein WFB No. 12: Menuet 2
| G min.
| Keyboard
| data-sort-value="000.36: 209 45 1: 216" | 36: 209451: 216
| data-sort-value="V/05: 017" | V/5: 17
| by Bach, W. F. (BR A43) & J. S.?
| 
|- style="background: #F5F6CE;"
| data-sort-value="0843.000" | 843
| data-sort-value="374.011" | 8.
| data-sort-value="1720-12-31" | 1720–1721
| Klavierbüchlein WFB No. 13: Menuet 3
| G maj.
| Keyboard
| data-sort-value="000.36: 210 45 1: 216" | 36: 210451: 216
| data-sort-value="V/05: 018" | V/5: 18
| 
| 
|- id="BGA14" style="background: #E3F6CE;"
| data-sort-value="0846.000" | 846
| data-sort-value="375.006" | 8.
| data-sort-value="1722-07-01" | 1722
| data-sort-value="Well-Tempered Clavier I No. 01" | Well-Tempered Clavier I, P. & F. No. 1
| C maj.
| Keyboard
| data-sort-value="000.14: 003" | 14: 3
| data-sort-value="V/06 1: 002" | V/6.1: 2
| data-sort-value="after BWV 0846a" | after BWV 846a
| 
|- style="background: #F5F6CE;"
| data-sort-value="0846.001" | 846/1
| data-sort-value="375.007" | 8.
| data-sort-value="1725-07-01" | 1725 (AMB)
| Notebook A. M. Bach (1725) No. 29 Prelude (short version of WTC I No. 1/1)
| C maj.
| Keyboard
| 
| data-sort-value="V/04: 107" | V/4: 107
| 
| 
|- style="background: #E3F6CE;"
| data-sort-value="0846.A00" | 846a
| data-sort-value="375.008" | 8.
| data-sort-value="1720-07-01" | 1720
| Klavierbüchlein WFB No. 14: Praeludium 1 (early WTC I No. 1/1)
| C maj.
| Keyboard
| data-sort-value="000.45 1: 216" | 451: 216
| data-sort-value="V/05: 019 V/06 1: 127" | V/5: 19V/6.1: 127
| data-sort-value="→ BWV 0846/1" | → BWV 846/1
| 
|- style="background: #E3F6CE;"
| data-sort-value="0847.000" | 847
| data-sort-value="375.009" | 8.
| data-sort-value="1722-07-01" | 1722
| data-sort-value="Well-Tempered Clavier I No. 02" | Well-Tempered Clavier I, P. & F. No. 2 (/1 = WFB No. 15: Praeludium 2)
| C min.
| Keyboard
| data-sort-value="000.14: 006" | 14: 6451: 216
| data-sort-value="V/05: 020 V/06 1: 002" | V/5: 20V/6.1: 2
| data-sort-value="after BWV 0847a" | after BWV 847a
| 
|-
| data-sort-value="0847.A00" | 847a
| data-sort-value="375.010" | 8.
| 
| data-sort-value="Prelude and Fughetta (early WTC I No. 02)" | Prelude and Fughetta (early WTC I No. 2)
| C min.
| Keyboard
| 
| data-sort-value="V/06 1: 130" | V/6.1: 130
| data-sort-value="→ BWV 0847" | → BWV 847
| 
|- style="background: #E3F6CE;"
| data-sort-value="0848.000" | 848
| data-sort-value="375.011" | 8.
| data-sort-value="1722-07-01" | 1722
| data-sort-value="Well-Tempered Clavier I No. 03" | Well-Tempered Clavier I, P. & F. No. 3 (/1 = WFB No. 21: Praeludium [8])
| C♯ maj.
| Keyboard
| data-sort-value="000.14: 010" | 14: 10451: 218
| data-sort-value="V/05: 030 V/06 1: 002" | V/5: 30V/6.1: 2
| data-sort-value="after BWV 0848a" | after BWV 848a
| 
|-
| data-sort-value="0848.A00" | 848a
| data-sort-value="375.012" | 8.
| 
| data-sort-value="Prelude and Fughetta (early WTC I No. 03)" | Prelude and Fughetta (early WTC I No. 3)
| C♯ maj.
| Keyboard
| 
| data-sort-value="V/06 1: 134" | V/6.1: 134
| data-sort-value="→ BWV 0848" | → BWV 848
| 
|- style="background: #E3F6CE;"
| data-sort-value="0849.000" | 849
| data-sort-value="375.013" | 8.
| data-sort-value="1722-07-01" | 1722
| data-sort-value="Well-Tempered Clavier I No. 04" | Well-Tempered Clavier I, P. & F. No. 4 (/1 = WFB No. 22: Praeludium [9])
| C♯ min.
| Keyboard
| data-sort-value="000.14: 014" | 14: 14451: 218
| data-sort-value="V/05: 032 V/06 1: 002" | V/5: 32V/6.1: 2
| data-sort-value="after BWV 0849a" | after BWV 849a
| 
|-
| data-sort-value="0849.A00" | 849a
| data-sort-value="375.014" | 8.
| 
| data-sort-value="Prelude and Fughetta (early WTC I No. 04)" | Prelude and Fughetta (early WTC I No. 4)
| C♯ min.
| Keyboard
| 
| data-sort-value="V/06 1: 140" | V/6.1: 140
| data-sort-value="→ BWV 0849" | → BWV 849
| 
|- style="background: #E3F6CE;"
| data-sort-value="0850.000" | 850
| data-sort-value="375.015" | 8.
| data-sort-value="1722-07-01" | 1722
| data-sort-value="Well-Tempered Clavier I No. 05" | Well-Tempered Clavier I, P. & F. No. 5 (/1 = WFB No. 17: Praeludium 4)
| D maj.
| Keyboard
| data-sort-value="000.14: 018" | 14: 18451: 217
| data-sort-value="V/05: 023 V/06 1: 002" | V/5: 23V/6.1: 2
| data-sort-value="after BWV 0850a" | after BWV 850a
| 
|-
| data-sort-value="0850.A00" | 850a
| data-sort-value="375.016" | 8.
| 
| data-sort-value="Prelude and Fughetta (early WTC I No. 05)" | Prelude and Fughetta (early WTC I No. 5)
| D maj.
| Keyboard
| 
| data-sort-value="V/06 1: 146" | V/6.1: 146
| data-sort-value="→ BWV 0850" | → BWV 850
| 
|- style="background: #E3F6CE;"
| data-sort-value="0851.000" | 851
| data-sort-value="375.017" | 8.
| data-sort-value="1722-07-01" | 1722
| data-sort-value="Well-Tempered Clavier I No. 06" | Well-Tempered Clavier I, P. & F. No. 6 (/1 = WFB No. 16: Praeludium 3)
| D min.
| Keyboard
| data-sort-value="000.14: 022" | 14: 22451: 217
| data-sort-value="V/05: 022 V/06 1: 002" | V/5: 22V/6.1: 2
| data-sort-value="after BWV 0851a" | after BWV 851a
| 
|-
| data-sort-value="0851.A00" | 851a
| data-sort-value="375.018" | 8.
| 
| data-sort-value="Prelude and Fughetta (early WTC I No. 06)" | Prelude and Fughetta (early WTC I No. 6)
| D min.
| Keyboard
| 
| data-sort-value="V/06 1: 150" | V/6.1: 150
| data-sort-value="→ BWV 0851" | → BWV 851
| 
|- style="background: #E3F6CE;"
| data-sort-value="0852.000" | 852
| data-sort-value="375.019" | 8.
| data-sort-value="1722-07-01" | 1722
| data-sort-value="Well-Tempered Clavier I No. 07" | Well-Tempered Clavier I, P. & F. No. 7
| E♭ maj.
| Keyboard
| data-sort-value="000.14: 026" | 14: 26
| data-sort-value="V/06 1: 032" | V/6.1: 32
| data-sort-value="after BWV 0852a" | after BWV 852a
| 
|-
| data-sort-value="0852.A00" | 852a
| data-sort-value="375.020" | 8.
| 
| data-sort-value="Prelude and Fughetta (early WTC I No. 07)" | Prelude and Fughetta (early WTC I No. 7)
| E♭ maj.
| Keyboard
| 
| data-sort-value="V/06 1: 154" | V/6.1: 154
| data-sort-value="→ BWV 0852" | → BWV 852
| 
|- style="background: #E3F6CE;"
| data-sort-value="0853.000" | 853
| data-sort-value="375.021" | 8.
| data-sort-value="1722-07-01" | 1722
| data-sort-value="Well-Tempered Clavier I No. 08" | Well-Tempered Clavier I, P. & F. No. 8 (/1 = WFB No. 23: Praeludium [10])
| E♭ min.D♯ min.
| Keyboard
| data-sort-value="000.14: 032" | 14: 32451: 218
| data-sort-value="V/05: 034 V/06 1: 038" | V/5: 34V/6.1: 38
| data-sort-value="after BWV 0853a;" | after BWV 853a; → K. 404a/1
| 
|-
| data-sort-value="0853.A00" | 853a
| data-sort-value="375.022" | 8.
| 
| data-sort-value="Prelude and Fughetta (early WTC I No. 08)" | Prelude and Fughetta (early WTC I No. 8)
| E♭ min.D♯ min.
| Keyboard
| 
| data-sort-value="V/06 1: 160" | V/6.1: 160
| data-sort-value="→ BWV 0853" | → BWV 853
| 
|- style="background: #E3F6CE;"
| data-sort-value="0854.000" | 854
| data-sort-value="375.023" | 8.
| data-sort-value="1722-07-01" | 1722
| data-sort-value="Well-Tempered Clavier I No. 09" | Well-Tempered Clavier I, P. & F. No. 9 (/1 = WFB No. 19: Praeludium 6)
| E maj.
| Keyboard
| data-sort-value="000.14: 036" | 14: 36451: 218
| data-sort-value="V/05: 026 V/06 1: 044" | V/5: 26V/6.1: 44
| data-sort-value="after BWV 0854a" | after BWV 854a
| 
|-
| data-sort-value="0854.A00" | 854a
| data-sort-value="375.024" | 8.
| 
| data-sort-value="Prelude and Fughetta (early WTC I No. 09)" | Prelude and Fughetta (early WTC I No. 9)
| E maj.
| Keyboard
| 
| data-sort-value="V/06 1: 166" | V/6.1: 166
| data-sort-value="→ BWV 0854" | → BWV 854
| 
|- style="background: #E3F6CE;"
| data-sort-value="0855.000" | 855
| data-sort-value="375.025" | 8.
| data-sort-value="1722-07-01" | 1722
| data-sort-value="Well-Tempered Clavier I No. 10" | Well-Tempered Clavier I, P. & F. No. 10
| E min.
| Keyboard
| data-sort-value="000.14: 038" | 14: 38
| data-sort-value="V/06 1: 048" | V/6.1: 48
| data-sort-value="after BWV 0855a" | after BWV 855a
| 
|- style="background: #F5F6CE;"
| data-sort-value="0855.A00" | 855a
| data-sort-value="375.026" | 8.
| data-sort-value="1720-07-01" | 1720
| Prelude and Fughetta (early WTC I No. 10) (/1 = WFB No. 18: Praeludium 5)
| E min.
| Keyboard
| data-sort-value="000.45 1: 217" | 451: 217
| data-sort-value="V/05: 024 V/06 1: 170" | V/5: 24V/6.1: 170
| data-sort-value="→ BWV 0855" | → BWV 855
| 
|- style="background: #E3F6CE;"
| data-sort-value="0856.000" | 856
| data-sort-value="375.027" | 8.
| data-sort-value="1722-07-01" | 1722
| data-sort-value="Well-Tempered Clavier I No. 11" | Well-Tempered Clavier I, P. & F. No. 11 (/1 = WFB No. 20: Praeludium 7)
| F maj.
| Keyboard
| data-sort-value="000.14: 042" | 14: 42451: 218
| data-sort-value="V/05: 028 V/06 1: 054" | V/5: 28V/6.1: 54
| data-sort-value="after BWV 0856a" | after BWV 856a
| 
|-
| data-sort-value="0856.A00" | 856a
| data-sort-value="375.028" | 8.
| 
| Prelude and Fughetta (early WTC I No. 11)
| F maj.
| Keyboard
| 
| data-sort-value="V/06 1: 174" | V/6.1: 174
| data-sort-value="→ BWV 0856" | → BWV 856
| 
|- style="background: #E3F6CE;"
| data-sort-value="0857.000" | 857
| data-sort-value="375.029" | 8.
| data-sort-value="1722-07-01" | 1722
| data-sort-value="Well-Tempered Clavier I No. 12" | Well-Tempered Clavier I, P. & F. No. 12 (/1 = WFB No. 24: Praeludium [11])
| F min.
| Keyboard
| data-sort-value="000.14: 044" | 14: 44451: 218
| data-sort-value="V/05: 036 V/06 1: 058" | V/5: 36V/6.1: 58
| data-sort-value="after BWV 0857a" | after BWV 857a
| 
|-
| data-sort-value="0857.A00" | 857a
| data-sort-value="375.030" | 8.
| 
| Prelude and Fughetta (early WTC I No. 12)
| F min.
| Keyboard
| 
| data-sort-value="V/06 1: 178" | V/6.1: 178
| data-sort-value="→ BWV 0857" | → BWV 857
| 
|- style="background: #E3F6CE;"
| data-sort-value="0858.000" | 858
| data-sort-value="375.031" | 8.
| data-sort-value="1722-07-01" | 1722
| data-sort-value="Well-Tempered Clavier I No. 13" | Well-Tempered Clavier I, P. & F. No. 13
| F♯ maj.
| Keyboard
| data-sort-value="000.14: 048" | 14: 48
| data-sort-value="V/06 1: 064" | V/6.1: 64
| data-sort-value="after BWV 0858a" | after BWV 858a
| 
|-
| data-sort-value="0858.A00" | 858a
| data-sort-value="375.032" | 8.
| 
| Prelude and Fughetta (early WTC I No. 13)
| F♯ maj.
| Keyboard
| 
| data-sort-value="V/06 1: 184" | V/6.1: 184
| data-sort-value="→ BWV 0858" | → BWV 858
| 
|- style="background: #E3F6CE;"
| data-sort-value="0859.000" | 859
| data-sort-value="375.033" | 8.
| data-sort-value="1722-07-01" | 1722
| data-sort-value="Well-Tempered Clavier I No. 14" | Well-Tempered Clavier I, P. & F. No. 14
| F♯ min.
| Keyboard
| data-sort-value="000.14: 050" | 14: 50
| data-sort-value="V/06 1: 064" | V/6.1: 64
| data-sort-value="after BWV 0859a" | after BWV 859a
| 
|-
| data-sort-value="0859.A00" | 859a
| data-sort-value="375.034" | 8.
| 
| Prelude and Fughetta (early WTC I No. 14)
| F♯ min.
| Keyboard
| 
| data-sort-value="V/06 1: 188" | V/6.1: 188
| data-sort-value="→ BWV 0859" | → BWV 859
| 
|- style="background: #E3F6CE;"
| data-sort-value="0860.000" | 860
| data-sort-value="375.035" | 8.
| data-sort-value="1722-07-01" | 1722
| data-sort-value="Well-Tempered Clavier I No. 15" | Well-Tempered Clavier I, P. & F. No. 15
| G maj.
| Keyboard
| data-sort-value="000.14: 052" | 14: 52
| data-sort-value="V/06 1: 072" | V/6.1: 72
| data-sort-value="after BWV 0860a" | after BWV 860a
| 
|-
| data-sort-value="0860.A00" | 860a
| data-sort-value="375.036" | 8.
| 
| Prelude and Fughetta (early WTC I No. 15)
| G maj.
| Keyboard
| 
| data-sort-value="V/06 1: 192" | V/6.1: 192
| data-sort-value="→ BWV 0860" | → BWV 860
| 
|- style="background: #E3F6CE;"
| data-sort-value="0861.000" | 861
| data-sort-value="375.037" | 8.
| data-sort-value="1722-07-01" | 1722
| data-sort-value="Well-Tempered Clavier I No. 16" | Well-Tempered Clavier I, P. & F. No. 16
| G min.
| Keyboard
| data-sort-value="000.14: 057" | 14: 57
| data-sort-value="V/06 1: 078" | V/6.1: 78
|data-sort-value="after BWV 0861a" | after BWV 861a
| 
|-
| data-sort-value="0861.A00" | 861a
| data-sort-value="375.038" | 8.
| 
| Prelude and Fughetta (early WTC I No. 16)
| G min.
| Keyboard
| 
| data-sort-value="V/06 1: 198" | V/6.1: 198
| data-sort-value="→ BWV 0861" | → BWV 861
| 
|- style="background: #E3F6CE;"
| data-sort-value="0862.000" | 862
| data-sort-value="375.039" | 8.
| data-sort-value="1722-07-01" | 1722
| data-sort-value="Well-Tempered Clavier I No. 17" | Well-Tempered Clavier I, P. & F. No. 17
| A♭ maj.
| Keyboard
| data-sort-value="000.14: 060" | 14: 60
| data-sort-value="V/06 1: 082" | V/6.1: 82
| data-sort-value="after BWV 0862a" | after BWV 862a
| 
|-
| data-sort-value="0862.A00" | 862a
| data-sort-value="375.040" | 8.
| 
| Prelude and Fughetta (early WTC I No. 17)
| A♭ maj.
| Keyboard
| 
| data-sort-value="V/06 1: 202" | V/6.1: 202
| data-sort-value="→ BWV 0862" | → BWV 862
| 
|- style="background: #E3F6CE;"
| data-sort-value="0863.000" | 863
| data-sort-value="375.041" | 8.
| data-sort-value="1722-07-01" | 1722
| data-sort-value="Well-Tempered Clavier I No. 18" | Well-Tempered Clavier I, P. & F. No. 18
| G♯ min.
| Keyboard
| data-sort-value="000.14: 064" | 14: 64
| data-sort-value="V/06 1: 086" | V/6.1: 86
| data-sort-value="after BWV 0863a" | after BWV 863a
| 
|-
| data-sort-value="0863.A00" | 863a
| data-sort-value="375.042" | 8.
| 
| Prelude and Fughetta (early WTC I No. 18)
| G♯ min.
| Keyboard
| 
| data-sort-value="V/06 1: 206" | V/6.1: 206
| data-sort-value="→ BWV 0863" | → BWV 863
| 
|- style="background: #E3F6CE;"
| data-sort-value="0864.000" | 864
| data-sort-value="375.043" | 8.
| data-sort-value="1722-07-01" | 1722
| data-sort-value="Well-Tempered Clavier I No. 19" | Well-Tempered Clavier I, P. & F. No. 19
| A maj.
| Keyboard
| data-sort-value="000.14: 066" | 14: 66
| data-sort-value="V/06 1: 090" | V/6.1: 90
| data-sort-value="after BWV 0864a" | after BWV 864a
| 
|-
| data-sort-value="0864.A00" | 864a
| data-sort-value="375.044" | 8.
| 
| Prelude and Fughetta (early WTC I No. 19)
| A maj.
| Keyboard
| 
| data-sort-value="V/06 1: 210" | V/6.1: 210
| data-sort-value="→ BWV 0864" | → BWV 864
| 
|- style="background: #E3F6CE;"
| data-sort-value="0865.000" | 865
| data-sort-value="375.045" | 8.
| data-sort-value="1722-07-01" | 1722
| data-sort-value="Well-Tempered Clavier I No. 20" | Well-Tempered Clavier I, P. & F. No. 20
| A min.
| Keyboard
| data-sort-value="000.14: 070" | 14: 70
| data-sort-value="V/06 1: 096" | V/6.1: 96
| data-sort-value="after BWV 0865a" | after BWV 865a
| 
|-
| data-sort-value="0865.A00" | 865a
| data-sort-value="375.046" | 8.
| 
| Prelude and Fughetta (early WTC I No. 20)
| A min.
| Keyboard
| 
| data-sort-value="V/06 1: 216" | V/6.1: 216
| data-sort-value="→ BWV 0865" | → BWV 865
| 
|- style="background: #E3F6CE;"
| data-sort-value="0866.000" | 866
| data-sort-value="375.047" | 8.
| data-sort-value="1722-07-01" | 1722
| data-sort-value="Well-Tempered Clavier I No. 21" | Well-Tempered Clavier I, P. & F. No. 21
| B♭ maj.
| Keyboard
| data-sort-value="000.14: 074" | 14: 74
| data-sort-value="V/06 1: 104" | V/6.1: 104
| data-sort-value="after BWV 0866a" | after BWV 866a
| 
|-
| data-sort-value="0866.A00" | 866a
| data-sort-value="375.048" | 8.
| 
| Prelude and Fughetta (early WTC I No. 21)
| B♭ maj.
| Keyboard
| 
| data-sort-value="V/06 1: 224" | V/6.1: 224
| data-sort-value="→ BWV 0866" | → BWV 866
| 
|- style="background: #E3F6CE;"
| data-sort-value="0867.000" | 867
| data-sort-value="375.049" | 8.
| data-sort-value="1722-07-01" | 1722
| data-sort-value="Well-Tempered Clavier I No. 22" | Well-Tempered Clavier I, P. & F. No. 22
| B♭ min.
| Keyboard
| data-sort-value="000.14: 078" | 14: 78
| data-sort-value="V/06 1: 108" | V/6.1: 108
| data-sort-value="after BWV 0867a;" | after BWV 867a; → 
| 
|-
| data-sort-value="0867.A00" | 867a
| data-sort-value="375.050" | 8.
| 
| Prelude and Fughetta (early WTC I No. 22)
| B♭ min.
| Keyboard
| 
| data-sort-value="V/06 1: 228" | V/6.1: 228
| data-sort-value="→ BWV 0867" | → BWV 867
| 
|- style="background: #E3F6CE;"
| data-sort-value="0868.000" | 868
| data-sort-value="375.051" | 8.
| data-sort-value="1722-07-01" | 1722
| data-sort-value="Well-Tempered Clavier I No. 23" | Well-Tempered Clavier I, P. & F. No. 23
| B maj.
| Keyboard
| data-sort-value="000.14: 082" | 14: 82
| data-sort-value="V/06 1: 112" | V/6.1: 112
| data-sort-value="after BWV 0868a" | after BWV 868a
| 
|-
| data-sort-value="0868.A00" | 868a
| data-sort-value="375.052" | 8.
| 
| Prelude and Fughetta (early WTC I No. 23)
| B maj.
| Keyboard
| 
| data-sort-value="V/06 1: 232" | V/6.1: 232
| data-sort-value="→ BWV 0868" | → BWV 868
| 
|- style="background: #E3F6CE;"
| data-sort-value="0869.000" | 869
| data-sort-value="375.053" | 8.
| data-sort-value="1722-07-01" | 1722
| data-sort-value="Well-Tempered Clavier I No. 24" | Well-Tempered Clavier I, P. & F. No. 24
| B min.
| Keyboard
| data-sort-value="000.14: 084" | 14: 84
| data-sort-value="V/06 1: 116" | V/6.1: 116
| data-sort-value="after BWV 0869a" | after BWV 869a
| 
|-
| data-sort-value="0869.A00" | 869a
| data-sort-value="375.054" | 8.
| 
| Prelude and Fughetta (early WTC I No. 24)
| B min.
| Keyboard
| 
| data-sort-value="V/06 1: 236" | V/6.1: 236
| data-sort-value="→ BWV 0869" | → BWV 869
| 
|- id="NBAV-6-2" style="background: #E3F6CE;"
| data-sort-value="0870.b00" | 870b870/2
| data-sort-value="379.005" | 8.
| data-sort-value="1740-12-31" | 1739–1742
| data-sort-value="Well-Tempered Clavier II No. 01 A" | Well-Tempered Clavier II, P. & F. No. 1 (version A)
| C maj.
| Keyboard
| data-sort-value="000.45 1: 243" | 451: 24314: 94
| data-sort-value="V/06 2: 002" | V/6.2: 2,6, 342
| 
| 
|- style="background: #E3F6CE;"
| data-sort-value="0871.000" | 871
| data-sort-value="379.006" | 8.
| data-sort-value="1740-12-31" | 1739–17421744
| data-sort-value="Well-Tempered Clavier II No. 02" | Well-Tempered Clavier II, P. & F. No. 2
| C min.
| Keyboard
| data-sort-value="000.14: 096" | 14: 96
| data-sort-value="V/06 2: 008" | V/6.2: 8,160
| → K. 405/1
| 
|- style="background: #E3F6CE;"
| data-sort-value="0872.000" | 872
| data-sort-value="379.007" | 8.
| data-sort-value="1740-12-31" | 1739–17421744
| data-sort-value="Well-Tempered Clavier II No. 03" | Well-Tempered Clavier II, P. & F. No. 3
| C♯ maj.
| Keyboard
| data-sort-value="000.14: 100" | 14: 100
| data-sort-value="V/06 2: 012" | V/6.2: 12,164, 352
| data-sort-value="after BWV 0872a" | after BWV 872a
| 
|- style="background: #F5F6CE;"
| data-sort-value="0872.A01" | 872a/1
| data-sort-value="379.008" | 8.
| data-sort-value="1739-12-31" | 1739–1740
| Prelude (early WTC II, P. & F. No. 3/1)
| C maj.
| Keyboard
| data-sort-value="000.14: 243" | 14: 243
| data-sort-value="V/06 2: 344" | V/6.2: 344
| data-sort-value="→ BWV 0872/1" | → BWV 872/1
| 
|- style="background: #F6E3CE;"
| data-sort-value="0872.A02" | 872a/2
| data-sort-value="379.009" | 8.
| data-sort-value="1738-07-01" | 1738
| Fughetta (early WTC II, P. & F. No. 3/2)
| C maj.
| Keyboard
| data-sort-value="000.36: 224" | 36: 224
| data-sort-value="V/06 2: 358" | V/6.2: 358
| data-sort-value="→ BWV 0872/2" | → BWV 872/2
| 
|- style="background: #E3F6CE;"
| data-sort-value="0873.000" | 873
| data-sort-value="379.010" | 8.
| data-sort-value="1740-12-31" | 1739–17421744
| data-sort-value="Well-Tempered Clavier II No. 04" | Well-Tempered Clavier II, P. & F. No. 4
| C♯ maj.
| Keyboard
| data-sort-value="000.14: 104" | 14: 104
| data-sort-value="V/06 2: 016" | V/6.2: 16,168
| 
| 
|- style="background: #E3F6CE;"
| data-sort-value="0874.000" | 874
| data-sort-value="379.011" | 8.
| data-sort-value="1740-12-31" | 1739–17421744
| data-sort-value="Well-Tempered Clavier II No. 05" | Well-Tempered Clavier II, P. & F. No. 5
| D maj.
| Keyboard
| data-sort-value="000.14: 108" | 14: 108
| data-sort-value="V/06 2: 024" | V/6.2: 24,176
| → K. 405/5
| 
|- style="background: #E3F6CE;"
| data-sort-value="0875.000" | 875
| data-sort-value="379.012" | 8.
| data-sort-value="1740-12-31" | 1739–17421744
| data-sort-value="Well-Tempered Clavier II No. 06" | Well-Tempered Clavier II, P. & F. No. 6
| D min.
| Keyboard
| data-sort-value="000.14: 112" | 14: 112
| data-sort-value="V/06 2: 030" | V/6.2: 30182, 348,356
| data-sort-value="after BWV 0875a" | after BWV 875a
| 
|- style="background: #F5F6CE;"
| data-sort-value="0875.A00" | 875a
| data-sort-value="379.013" | 8.
| data-sort-value="1739-12-31" | 1739–1740
| Preambulum (early WTC II, P. & F. No. 6/1)
| D min.
| Keyboard
| data-sort-value="000.36: 224" | 36: 224
| data-sort-value="V/06 2: 346" | V/6.2: 346
| data-sort-value="→ BWV 0875/1" | → BWV 875/1
| 
|- style="background: #E3F6CE;"
| data-sort-value="0876.000" | 876
| data-sort-value="379.014" | 8.
| data-sort-value="1740-12-31" | 1739–17421744
| data-sort-value="Well-Tempered Clavier II No. 07" | Well-Tempered Clavier II, P. & F. No. 7
| E♭ maj.
| Keyboard
| data-sort-value="000.14: 116" | 14: 116
| data-sort-value="V/06 2: 036" | V/6.2: 36,188, 354
| → K. 405/2
| 
|- style="background: #E3F6CE;"
| data-sort-value="0877.000" | 877
| data-sort-value="379.015" | 8.
| data-sort-value="1740-12-31" | 1739–17421744
| data-sort-value="Well-Tempered Clavier II No. 08" | Well-Tempered Clavier II, P. & F. No. 8
| D♯ min.
| Keyboard
| data-sort-value="000.14: 120" | 14: 120
| data-sort-value="V/06 2: 042" | V/6.2: 42,194
| → K. 405/4
| 
|- style="background: #E3F6CE;"
| data-sort-value="0878.000" | 878
| data-sort-value="379.016" | 8.
| data-sort-value="1740-12-31" | 1739–17421744
| data-sort-value="Well-Tempered Clavier II No. 09" | Well-Tempered Clavier II, P. & F. No. 9
| E maj.
| Keyboard
| data-sort-value="000.14: 124" | 14: 124
| data-sort-value="V/06 2: 048" | V/6.2: 48,200
| → K. 405/3
| 
|- style="background: #E3F6CE;"
| data-sort-value="0879.000" | 879
| data-sort-value="379.017" | 8.
| data-sort-value="1740-12-31" | 1739–17421744
| data-sort-value="Well-Tempered Clavier II No. 10" | Well-Tempered Clavier II, P. & F. No. 10
| E min.
| Keyboard
| data-sort-value="000.14: 128" | 14: 128
| data-sort-value="V/06 2: 054" | V/6.2: 54,206
| 
| 
|- style="background: #E3F6CE;"
| data-sort-value="0880.000" | 880
| data-sort-value="379.018" | 8.
| data-sort-value="1740-12-31" | 1739–17421744
| data-sort-value="Well-Tempered Clavier II No. 11" | Well-Tempered Clavier II, P. & F. No. 11
| F maj.
| Keyboard
| data-sort-value="000.14: 134" | 14: 134
| data-sort-value="V/06 2: 062" | V/6.2: 62,215
| 
| 
|- style="background: #E3F6CE;"
| data-sort-value="0881.000" | 881
| data-sort-value="379.019" | 8.
| data-sort-value="1740-12-31" | 1739–17421744
| data-sort-value="Well-Tempered Clavier II No. 12" | Well-Tempered Clavier II, P. & F. No. 12
| F min.
| Keyboard
| data-sort-value="000.14: 138" | 14: 138
| data-sort-value="V/06 2: 069" | V/6.2: 69,221
| 
| 
|- style="background: #E3F6CE;"
| data-sort-value="0882.000" | 882
| data-sort-value="379.020" | 8.
| data-sort-value="1740-12-31" | 1739–17421744
| data-sort-value="Well-Tempered Clavier II No. 13" | Well-Tempered Clavier II, P. & F. No. 13
| F♯ maj.
| Keyboard
| data-sort-value="000.14: 142" | 14: 142
| data-sort-value="V/06 2: 076" | V/6.2: 76,228
| → K. 404a/3
| 
|- style="background: #E3F6CE;"
| data-sort-value="0883.000" | 883
| data-sort-value="379.021" | 8.
| data-sort-value="1740-12-31" | 1739–17421744
| data-sort-value="Well-Tempered Clavier II No. 14" | Well-Tempered Clavier II, P. & F. No. 14
| F♯ min.
| Keyboard
| data-sort-value="000.14: 146" | 14: 146
| data-sort-value="V/06 2: 084" | V/6.2: 84,236
| → K. 404a/2
| 
|- style="background: #E3F6CE;"
| data-sort-value="0884.000" | 884
| data-sort-value="379.022" | 8.
| data-sort-value="1740-12-31" | 1739–17421744
| data-sort-value="Well-Tempered Clavier II No. 15" | Well-Tempered Clavier II, P. & F. No. 15
| G maj.
| Keyboard
| data-sort-value="000.14: 150" | 14: 150
| data-sort-value="V/06 2: 090" | V/6.2: 90,242, 350
| data-sort-value="after BWV 0902/2" | after BWV 902/2
| 
|- style="background: #E3F6CE;"
| data-sort-value="0885.000" | 885
| data-sort-value="379.023" | 8.
| data-sort-value="1740-12-31" | 1739–17421744
| data-sort-value="Well-Tempered Clavier II No. 16" | Well-Tempered Clavier II, P. & F. No. 16
| G min.
| Keyboard
| data-sort-value="000.14: 154" | 14: 154
| data-sort-value="V/06 2: 094" | V/6.2: 94,246
| 
| 
|- style="background: #E3F6CE;"
| data-sort-value="0886.000" | 886
| data-sort-value="379.024" | 8.
| data-sort-value="1740-12-31" | 1739–17421744
| data-sort-value="Well-Tempered Clavier II No. 17" | Well-Tempered Clavier II, P. & F. No. 17
| A♭ maj.
| Keyboard
| data-sort-value="000.14: 160" | 14: 160
| data-sort-value="V/06 2: 100" | V/6.2: 100,108, 252
| data-sort-value="after BWV 0901/2" | after BWV 901/2
| 
|- style="background: #E3F6CE;"
| data-sort-value="0887.000" | 887
| data-sort-value="379.025" | 8.
| data-sort-value="1740-12-31" | 1739–17421744
| data-sort-value="Well-Tempered Clavier II No. 18" | Well-Tempered Clavier II, P. & F. No. 18
| G♯ min.
| Keyboard
| data-sort-value="000.14: 166" | 14: 166
| data-sort-value="V/06 2: 112" | V/6.2: 112,260
| 
| 
|- style="background: #E3F6CE;"
| data-sort-value="0888.000" | 888
| data-sort-value="379.026" | 8.
| data-sort-value="1740-12-31" | 1739–17421744
| data-sort-value="Well-Tempered Clavier II No. 19" | Well-Tempered Clavier II, P. & F. No. 19
| A maj.
| Keyboard
| data-sort-value="000.14: 172" | 14: 172
| data-sort-value="V/06 2: 120" | V/6.2: 120,268
| 
| 
|- style="background: #E3F6CE;"
| data-sort-value="0889.000" | 889
| data-sort-value="379.027" | 8.
| data-sort-value="1740-12-31" | 1739–17421744
| data-sort-value="Well-Tempered Clavier II No. 20" | Well-Tempered Clavier II, P. & F. No. 20
| A min.
| Keyboard
| data-sort-value="000.14: 176" | 14: 176
| data-sort-value="V/06 2: 124" | V/6.2: 124,272
| 
| 
|- style="background: #E3F6CE;"
| data-sort-value="0890.000" | 890
| data-sort-value="379.028" | 8.
| data-sort-value="1740-12-31" | 1739–17421744
| data-sort-value="Well-Tempered Clavier II No. 21" | Well-Tempered Clavier II, P. & F. No. 21
| B♭ maj.
| Keyboard
| data-sort-value="000.14: 180" | 14: 180
| data-sort-value="V/06 2: 128" | V/6.2: 128,276
| 
| 
|- style="background: #E3F6CE;"
| data-sort-value="0891.000" | 891
| data-sort-value="379.029" | 8.
| data-sort-value="1740-12-31" | 1739–17421744
| data-sort-value="Well-Tempered Clavier II No. 22" | Well-Tempered Clavier II, P. & F. No. 22
| B♭ min.
| Keyboard
| data-sort-value="000.14: 186" | 14: 186
| data-sort-value="V/06 2: 134" | V/6.2: 134,282
| 
| 
|- style="background: #E3F6CE;"
| data-sort-value="0892.000" | 892
| data-sort-value="379.030" | 8.
| data-sort-value="1740-12-31" | 1739–17421744
| data-sort-value="Well-Tempered Clavier II No. 23" | Well-Tempered Clavier II, P. & F. No. 23
| B maj.
| Keyboard
| data-sort-value="000.14: 192" | 14: 192
| data-sort-value="V/06 2: 142" | V/6.2: 142,290
| 
| 
|- style="background: #E3F6CE;"
| data-sort-value="0893.000" | 893
| data-sort-value="379.031" | 8.
| data-sort-value="1740-12-31" | 1739–17421744
| data-sort-value="Well-Tempered Clavier II No. 24" | Well-Tempered Clavier II, P. & F. No. 24
| B min.
| Keyboard
| data-sort-value="000.14: 198" | 14: 198
| data-sort-value="V/06 2: 150" | V/6.2: 150,298
| 
| 
|- id="BG14-91" style="background: #E3F6CE;"
| data-sort-value="0870.000" | 870
| data-sort-value="379.032" | 8.
| data-sort-value="1744-07-01" | 1744
| data-sort-value="Well-Tempered Clavier II No. 01 B" | Well-Tempered Clavier II, P. & F. No. 1 (version B)
| C maj.
| Keyboard
| data-sort-value="000.14: 091" | 14: 91
| data-sort-value="V/06 2: 156" | V/6.2: 156
| data-sort-value="after BWV 0870a" | after BWV 870a
| 
|- style="background: #F6E3CE;"
| data-sort-value="0894.000" | 894
| data-sort-value="383.002" | 8.
| data-sort-value="1713-12-31" | 1710–1717 (JTK)
| Prelude and Fugue
| A min.
| Keyboard
| data-sort-value="000.36: 091" | 36: 91
| data-sort-value="V/09 2: 040" | V/9.2: 40
| → BWV 1044/1, /3; in SBB P 801, P 804
| 
|- style="background: #F6E3CE;"
| data-sort-value="0895.000" | 895
| data-sort-value="383.003" | 8.
| data-sort-value="1709-04-03" | 1709 (JCB)
| Prelude and Fugue
| A min.
| Keyboard
| data-sort-value="000.36: 104" | 36: 104
| data-sort-value="V/09 2: 069" | V/9.2: 69
| in Yale LM 4982
| 
|- style="background: #F5F6CE;"
| data-sort-value="0896.000" | 896
| data-sort-value="384.001" | 8.
| data-sort-value="1705-12-31" | 1704–1707
| Prelude and Fugue
| A maj.
| Keyboard
| data-sort-value="000.36: 157" | 36: 157
| data-sort-value="V/09 2: 072" | V/9.2: 72
| in Möllersche Handschrift
| 
|- style="background: #F6E3CE;"
| data-sort-value="0870.A00" | 870a
| data-sort-value="384.003" | 8.
| data-sort-value="1726-07-01" | before 1727
| Prelude and Fughetta
| C maj.
| Keyboard
| data-sort-value="000.36: 224" | 36: 224
| data-sort-value="V/06 2: 307" | V/6.2: 307,310
| data-sort-value="→ BWV 0870" | → BWV 870; in SBB P 804, P 1089
| 
|- style="background: #F6E3CE;"
| data-sort-value="0899.000" | 899
| data-sort-value="384.004" | 8.
| data-sort-value="1726-07-01" | before 1727
| Prelude and Fughetta
| D min.
| Keyboard
| data-sort-value="000.36: 106" | 36: 106
| data-sort-value="V/06 2: 314" | V/6.2: 314V/12: 24
| in SBB P 804, P 1089
| 
|- style="background: #F6E3CE;"
| data-sort-value="0900.000" | 900
| data-sort-value="384.005" | 8.
| data-sort-value="1726-07-01" | before 1727
| Prelude and Fughetta
| E min.
| Keyboard
| data-sort-value="000.36: 108" | 36: 108
| data-sort-value="V/06 2: 318" | V/6.2V/12
| in SBB P 804, P 1089
| 
|- style="background: #F6E3CE;"
| data-sort-value="0901.000" | 901
| data-sort-value="384.006" | 8.
| data-sort-value="1726-07-01" | before 1727
| Prelude and Fughetta
| F maj.
| Keyboard
| data-sort-value="000.36: 112" | 36: 112
| data-sort-value="V/06 2: 324" | V/6.2: 324
| data-sort-value="→ BWV 0886/2" | → BWV 886/2; in SBB P 1089
| 
|- style="background: #F6E3CE;"
| data-sort-value="0902.000" | 902
| data-sort-value="384.007" | 8.
| data-sort-value="1729-07-01" | 1729
| Prelude and Fughetta
| G maj.
| Keyboard
| data-sort-value="000.36: 114" | 36: 114
| data-sort-value="V/06 2: 328" | V/6.2: 328
| data-sort-value="→ BWV 0884/2" | → BWV 884/2; in SBB P 804, P 1089
| 
|- style="background: #F6E3CE;"
| data-sort-value="0902.A01" | 902/1a
| data-sort-value="384.008" | 8.
| data-sort-value="1726-07-01" | before 1727
| Prelude (previous Prelude to BWV 902/2)
| G maj.
| Keyboard
| data-sort-value="000.36: 220" | 36: 220
| data-sort-value="V/06 2: 334" | V/6.2: 334,338
| data-sort-value="→ BWV 0884/2" | → BWV 884/2; in SBB P 804
| 
|- style="background: #F5F6CE;"
| data-sort-value="0903.000" | 903
| data-sort-value="385.005" | 8.
| 
| data-sort-value="Chromatic Fantasia and Fugue" | Chromatic Fantasia and Fugue
| D min.
| Keyboard
| data-sort-value="000.36: 071" | 36: 71
| data-sort-value="V/09 2: 076" | V/9.2: 76
| data-sort-value="after BWV 0903a;" | after BWV 903a; in SBB P 803, P 651
| 
|-
| data-sort-value="0903.A00" | 903a
| data-sort-value="386.001" | 8.
| 
| Fantasia (early BWV 903/1)
| D min.
| Keyboard
| data-sort-value="000.36: 219" | 36: 219
| data-sort-value="V/09 2: 090" | V/9.2: 90
| data-sort-value="→ BWV 0903/1" | → BWV 903/1; in D-DS Mus. ms. 69
| 
|- style="background: #F6E3CE;"
| data-sort-value="0904.000" | 904
| data-sort-value="386.002" | 8.
| data-sort-value="1726-07-01" | before 1727
| Fantasia and Fugue
| A min.
| Keyboard
| data-sort-value="000.36: 081" | 36: 81
| data-sort-value="V/09 2: 095" | V/9.2
| in SBB P 804
| 
|- style="background: #E3F6CE;"
| data-sort-value="0906.000" | 906
| data-sort-value="386.004" | 8.
| data-sort-value="1738-07-01" | before 17291738
| Fantasia and Fugue (Fugue incomplete)
| C min.
| Keyboard
| data-sort-value="000.36: 145" | 36: 145, 238
| data-sort-value="V/09 2: 110" | V/9.2: 110
| in US-BETbc, D-Dl Mus.2405-T-52
| 
|- style="background: #E3F6CE;"
| data-sort-value="0910.000" | 910
| data-sort-value="387.004" | 8.
| data-sort-value="1710-07-01" | 1707–1713
| Toccata
| F♯ min.
| Kb (or) Org
| data-sort-value="000.03: 311" | 3: 311
| data-sort-value="V/09 1: 001" | V/9.1: 1
| in Andreas-Bach-Buch
| 
|- style="background: #F5F6CE;"
| data-sort-value="0911.000" | 911
| data-sort-value="387.005" | 8.
| data-sort-value="1710-07-01" | 1707–1713
| Toccata
| C min.
| Kb (or) Org
| data-sort-value="000.03: 322" | 3: 322
| data-sort-value="V/09 1: 013" | V/9.1: 13
| in Andreas-Bach-Buch
| 
|- style="background: #F6E3CE;"
| data-sort-value="0912.000" | 912
| data-sort-value="388.001" | 8.
| data-sort-value="1710-07-01" | 1707–1713
| Toccata
| D maj.
| Kb (or) Org
| data-sort-value="000.36: 026" | 36: 26
| data-sort-value="V/09 1: 038" | V/9.1: 38
| data-sort-value="after BWV 0912a" | after BWV 912a; ↔ BWV 532/1
| 
|- style="background: #F5F6CE;"
| data-sort-value="0912.A00" | 912a
| data-sort-value="388.002" | 8.
| data-sort-value="1710-07-01" | 1704–1707
| Toccata
| D maj.
| Kb (or) Org
| data-sort-value="000.36: 218" | 36: 218
| data-sort-value="V/09 1: 026" | V/9.1: 26
| data-sort-value="→ BWV 0912" | → BWV 912; in Möllersche Handschrift
| 
|- style="background: #E3F6CE;"
| data-sort-value="0913.000" | 913
| data-sort-value="388.003" | 8.
| data-sort-value="1708-07-01" | 1707–1709
| Toccata
| D min.
| Kb (or) Org
| data-sort-value="000.36: 036" | 36: 36
| data-sort-value="V/09 1: 050" | V/9.1: 50, 63
| data-sort-value="after BWV 0913a" | after BWV 913a
| 
|-
| data-sort-value="0913.A00" | 913a
| data-sort-value="388.004" | 8.
| 
| Toccata
| D min.
| Kb (or) Org
| 
| data-sort-value="V/09 1: 052" | V/9.1: 52
| data-sort-value="→ BWV 0913" | → BWV 913; publ. 1801
| 
|- style="background: #E3F6CE;"
| data-sort-value="0914.000" | 914
| data-sort-value="389.001" | 8.
| data-sort-value="1708-07-01" | 1707–1709
| Toccata
| E min.
| Kb (or) Org
| data-sort-value="000.36: 047" | 36: 47
| data-sort-value="V/09 1: 078" | V/9.1: 78
| 
| 
|- 
| data-sort-value="0915.000" | 915
| data-sort-value="389.002" | 8.
| data-sort-value="1708-07-01" | 1707–1709
| Toccata
| G min.
| Kb (or) Org
| data-sort-value="000.36: 054" | 36: 54
| data-sort-value="V/09 1: 087" | V/9.1: 87
| 
| 
|- style="background: #F5F6CE;"
| data-sort-value="0916.000" | 916
| data-sort-value="390.001" | 8.
| data-sort-value="1710-07-01" | 1707–1713
| Toccata
| G maj.
| Kb (or) Org
| data-sort-value="000.36: 063" | 36: 63
| data-sort-value="V/09 1: 100" | V/9.1: 100
| in Andreas-Bach-Buch
| 
|- style="background: #F5F6CE;"
| data-sort-value="0917.000" | 917
| data-sort-value="390.002" | 8.
| data-sort-value="1705-12-31" | 1704–1707
| Fantasia
| G min.
| Keyboard
| data-sort-value="000.36: 143" | 36: 143
| data-sort-value="V/09 2: 014" | V/9.1: 14, 16
| in Möllersche Handschrift
| 
|- style="background: #F6E3CE;"
| data-sort-value="0918.000" | 918
| data-sort-value="390.003" | 8.
| 
| Fantasia on a Rondo
| C min.
| Keyboard
| data-sort-value="000.36: 148" | 36: 148
| data-sort-value="V/09 2: 018" | V/9.1: 14, 18
| 
| 
|- style="background: #E3F6CE;"
| data-sort-value="0921.000" | 921
| data-sort-value="390.006" | 8.
| data-sort-value="1710-07-01" | 1707–1713
| Prelude
| C min.
| Keyboard
| data-sort-value="000.36: 136" | 36: 136
| data-sort-value="V/09 2: 024" | V/9.1: 24
| in Andreas-Bach-Buch
| 
|- style="background: #F6E3CE;"
| data-sort-value="0922.000" | 922
| data-sort-value="391.002" | 8.
| data-sort-value="1712-07-01" | 1710–1714 (JTK)
| Prelude (Fantasia)
| A min.
| Keyboard
| data-sort-value="000.36: 138" | 36: 138
| data-sort-value="V/09 2: 027" | V/9.2: 27, 34
| in SBB P 803
| 
|-
| data-sort-value="0923.000" | 923
| data-sort-value="391.003" | 8.
| data-sort-value="1723-07-01" | 1723?
| Prelude
| B min.
| Keyboard
| data-sort-value="000.42: 211" | 42: 211
| data-sort-value="V/09 2: 116" | V/9.2: 116
| by Pachelbel, W. H.?; → BWV 923a; in SBB P 401
| 
|- id="12LP" style="background: #E3F6CE;"
| data-sort-value="0924.000" | 924
| data-sort-value="391.006" | 8.
| data-sort-value="1720-07-01" | 1720
| data-sort-value="Little Preludex12 No. 01" | Twelve Little Preludes No. 1: Preambulum (WFB No. 2)
| C maj.
| Keyboard
| data-sort-value="000.36: 118" | 36: 118451: 214
| data-sort-value="V/05: 004u" | V/5: 4
| data-sort-value="→ BWV 0924a" | → BWV 924a
| 
|- style="background: #F5F6CE;"
| data-sort-value="0924.A00" | 924a
| data-sort-value="391.007" | 8.
| data-sort-value="1723-07-01" | 1720–1726
| data-sort-value="Little Preludex12 No. 01a" | Twelve Little Preludes No. 1a: Preludium ex c (WFB No. 26)
| C maj.
| Keyboard
| data-sort-value="000.36: 221" | 36: 221451: 220
| data-sort-value="V/05: 041" | V/5: 41
| data-sort-value="after BWV 0924;" | after BWV 924; BR A44 F(add) 206
| 
|- style="background: #F5F6CE;"
| data-sort-value="0925.000" | 925
| data-sort-value="391.008" | 8.
| data-sort-value="1723-07-01" | 1720–1726
| data-sort-value="Little Preludex12 No. 04" | Twelve Little Preludes No. 4: Preludium ex d (WFB No. 27)
| D maj.
| Keyboard
| data-sort-value="000.36: 121" | 36: 121451: 220
| data-sort-value="V/05: 042" | V/5: 42
| BR A45 F(add) 206
| 
|- style="background: #E3F6CE;"
| data-sort-value="0926.000" | 926
| data-sort-value="391.009" | 8.
| data-sort-value="1720-07-01" | 1720
| data-sort-value="Little Preludex12 No. 05" | Twelve Little Preludes No. 5: Preludium (WFB No. 4)
| D min.
| Keyboard
| data-sort-value="000.36: 122" | 36: 122451: 214
| data-sort-value="V/05: 006" | V/5: 6
| 
| 
|- style="background: #F5F6CE;"
| data-sort-value="0927.000" | 927
| data-sort-value="391.010" | 8.
| data-sort-value="1723-07-01" | 1720–1726
| data-sort-value="Little Preludex12 No. 08" | Twelve Little Preludes No. 8: Preambulum (WFB No. 8)
| F maj.
| Keyboard
| data-sort-value="000.36: 124" | 36: 124451: 215
| data-sort-value="V/05: 010u" | V/5: 10
| 
| 
|- style="background: #E3F6CE;"
| data-sort-value="0928.000" | 928
| data-sort-value="391.011" | 8.
| data-sort-value="1723-07-01" | 1720–1726
| data-sort-value="Little Preludex12 No. 09" | Twelve Little Preludes No. 9: Preludium (WFB No. 10)
| F maj.
| Keyboard
| data-sort-value="000.36: 125" | 36: 124451: 215
| data-sort-value="V/05: 014" | V/5: 14
| 
| 
|- style="background: #E3F6CE;"
| data-sort-value="0929.000" | 929
| data-sort-value="391.012" | 8.
| data-sort-value="1723-07-01" | 1720–1726
| data-sort-value="Little Preludex12 No. 10" | Twelve Little Preludes No. 10: Trio for a Minuet by Stölzel (WFB No. 48e)
| G min.
| Keyboard
| data-sort-value="000.36: 126" | 36: 126451: 226
| data-sort-value="V/05: 089" | V/5: 89
| → BWV 814a
| 
|- style="background: #E3F6CE;"
| data-sort-value="0930.000" | 930
| data-sort-value="391.013" | 8.
| data-sort-value="1723-07-01" | 1720–1726
| data-sort-value="Little Preludex12 No. 11" | Twelve Little Preludes No. 11: Preambulum (WFB No. 9)
| G min.
| Keyboard
| data-sort-value="000.36: 126" | 36: 126451: 215
| data-sort-value="V/05: 012" | V/5: 12
| 
| 
|- style="background: #F5F6CE;"
| data-sort-value="0931.000" | 931
| data-sort-value="391.014" | 8.
| data-sort-value="1723-07-01" | 1720–1726
| Preludium, Klavierbüchlein WFB No. 29
| A min.
| Keyboard
| data-sort-value="000.36: 237" | 36: 237451: 220
| data-sort-value="V/05: 045" | V/5: 45
| BR A47 F(add) 206
| 
|- style="background: #F5F6CE;"
| data-sort-value="0932.000" | 932
| data-sort-value="391.015" | 8.
| data-sort-value="1723-07-01" | 1720–1726
| Preludium ex e, Klavierbüchlein WFB No. 28 (incomplete)
| E min.
| Keyboard
| data-sort-value="000.36: 237u" | 36: 237451: 220
| data-sort-value="V/05: 044" | V/5: 44
| BR A46 F(add) 206
| 
|-
| data-sort-value="0933.000" | 933
| data-sort-value="392.012" | 8.
| data-sort-value="1720-07-01" | 1717–1723?
| data-sort-value="Little Preludex06 No. 1" | Six Little Preludes No. 1
| C maj.
| Keyboard
| data-sort-value="000.36: 128" | 36: 128
| data-sort-value="V/09 2: 003" | V/9.2: 3
| data-sort-value="in SBB P 542" | in SBB P 542, P 885
| 
|-
| data-sort-value="0934.000" | 934
| data-sort-value="392.013" | 8.
| data-sort-value="1720-07-01" | 1717–1723?
| data-sort-value="Little Preludex06 No. 2" | Six Little Preludes No. 2
| C min.
| Keyboard
| data-sort-value="000.36: 129" | 36: 128
| data-sort-value="V/09 2: 004" | V/9.2: 4
| data-sort-value="in SBB P 542" | in SBB P 542, P 885
| 
|-
| data-sort-value="0935.000" | 935
| data-sort-value="392.014" | 8.
| data-sort-value="1720-07-01" | 1717–1723?
| data-sort-value="Little Preludex06 No. 3" | Six Little Preludes No. 3
| D min.
| Keyboard
| data-sort-value="000.36: 130" | 36: 130
| data-sort-value="V/09 2: 005" | V/9.2: 5
| data-sort-value="in SBB P 542" | in SBB P 542, P 885
| 
|-
| data-sort-value="0936.000" | 936
| data-sort-value="392.015" | 8.
| data-sort-value="1720-07-01" | 1717–1723?
| data-sort-value="Little Preludex06 No. 4" | Six Little Preludes No. 4
| D maj.
| Keyboard
| data-sort-value="000.36: 131" | 36: 131
| data-sort-value="V/09 2: 006" | V/9.2: 6
| data-sort-value="in SBB P 542" | in SBB P 542, P 885
| 
|-
| data-sort-value="0937.000" | 937
| data-sort-value="392.016" | 8.
| data-sort-value="1720-07-01" | 1717–1723?
| data-sort-value="Little Preludex06 No. 5" | Six Little Preludes No. 5
| E maj.
| Keyboard
| data-sort-value="000.36: 132" | 36: 132
| data-sort-value="V/09 2: 008" | V/9.2: 8
| data-sort-value="in SBB P 542" | in SBB P 542, P 885
| 
|-
| data-sort-value="0938.000" | 938
| data-sort-value="392.017" | 8.
| data-sort-value="1720-07-01" | 1717–1723?
| data-sort-value="Little Preludex06 No. 6" | Six Little Preludes No. 6
| E min.
| Keyboard
| data-sort-value="000.36: 133" | 36: 133
| data-sort-value="V/09 2: 010" | V/9.2: 10
| data-sort-value="in SBB P 542" | in SBB P 542, P 885
| 
|-
| data-sort-value="0939.000" | 939
| data-sort-value="393.002" | 8.
| data-sort-value="1726-12-31" | 1726–1727
| data-sort-value="Little Preludex05 No. 1" | Five Little Preludes No. 1 (=12 L. P. No. 2)
| C maj.
| Keyboard
| data-sort-value="000.36: 119" | 36: 119
| data-sort-value="V/12: 050" | V/12: 50
| by Bach?; in SBB P 804
| 
|-
| data-sort-value="0940.000" | 940
| data-sort-value="393.003" | 8.
| data-sort-value="1726-12-31" | 1726–1727
| data-sort-value="Little Preludex05 No. 2" | Five Little Preludes No. 2 (=12 L. P. No. 6)
| D min.
| Keyboard
| data-sort-value="000.36: 123" | 36: 123
| data-sort-value="V/12: 050u" | V/12: 50
| by Bach?; in SBB P 804
| 
|-
| data-sort-value="0941.000" | 941
| data-sort-value="393.004" | 8.
| data-sort-value="1726-12-31" | 1726–1727
| data-sort-value="Little Preludex05 No. 3" | Five Little Preludes No. 3 (=12 L. P. No. 7)
| E min.
| Keyboard
| data-sort-value="000.36: 123u" | 36: 123
| data-sort-value="V/12: 051" | V/12: 51
| by Bach?; in SBB P 804
| 
|-
| data-sort-value="0942.000" | 942
| data-sort-value="393.005" | 8.
| data-sort-value="1726-12-31" | 1726–1727
| data-sort-value="Little Preludex05 No. 4" | Five Little Preludes No. 4 (=12 L. P. No. 12)
| A min.
| Keyboard
| data-sort-value="000.36: 127" | 36: 127
| data-sort-value="V/12: 052" | V/12: 52
| by Bach?; in SBB P 804
| 
|- style="background: #F6E3CE;"
| data-sort-value="0943.000" | 943
| data-sort-value="393.006" | 8.
| data-sort-value="1726-07-01" | 1725–1727
| data-sort-value="Little Preludex05 No. 5" | Five Little Preludes No. 5
| C maj.
| Org (Kb?)
| data-sort-value="000.36: 134" | 36: 134
| data-sort-value="V/12: 053" | V/12: 53
| in SBB P 804
| 
|- style="background: #F5F6CE;"
| data-sort-value="0944.000" | 944
| data-sort-value="393.007" | 8.
| data-sort-value="1710-07-01" | 1707–1713
| Fantasia and Fugue
| A min.
| Keyboard
| data-sort-value="000.03: 334" | 3: 334
| data-sort-value="V/09 2: 133" | V/9.2: 133
| in Andreas-Bach-Buch
| 
|-
| data-sort-value="0946.000" | 946
| data-sort-value="393.009" | 8.
| data-sort-value="1709-12-31" | early work?
| Fugue on a theme by Albinoni
| C maj.
| Keyboard
| data-sort-value="000.36: 159" | 36: 159
| data-sort-value="V/09 2: 153" | V/9.2: 153
| after Albinoni, Op. 1, No. 12/4 (theme)  
| 
|- style="background: #F6E3CE;"
| data-sort-value="0947.000" | 947
| data-sort-value="394.002" | 8.
| data-sort-value="1709-12-31" | early work?
| Fugue
| A min.
| Keyboard
| data-sort-value="000.36: 161" | 36: 161
| data-sort-value="V/12: 055" | V/12: 55
| by Bach? 
| 
|-
| data-sort-value="0948.000" | 948
| data-sort-value="394.003" | 8.
| data-sort-value="1709-12-31" | early work?
| Fugue
| D min.
| Keyboard
| data-sort-value="000.36: 164" | 36: 164
| data-sort-value="V/09 2: 156" | V/9.2: 156
| in D-B N. Mus. ms. 10580 
| 
|- style="background: #F5F6CE;"
| data-sort-value="0949.000" | 949
| data-sort-value="394.004" | 8.
| data-sort-value="1710-07-01" | 1707–1713
| Fugue
| A maj.
| Keyboard
| data-sort-value="000.36: 169" | 36: 169
| data-sort-value="V/09 2: 163" | V/9.2: 163
| after Albinoni (theme)?; in Andreas-Bach-Buch 
| 
|- style="background: #F6E3CE;"
| data-sort-value="0950.000" | 950
| data-sort-value="394.005" | 8.
| data-sort-value="1724-07-01" | before 1725
| Fugue on a theme by Albinoni
| A maj.G maj.
| Keyboard
| data-sort-value="000.36: 173" | 36: 173
| data-sort-value="V/09 2: 168" | V/9.2: 168
| after Albinoni (theme); in SBB P 804
| 
|- style="background: #F6E3CE;"
| data-sort-value="0951.000" | 951
| data-sort-value="395.001" | 8.
| data-sort-value="1715-12-31" | 1714–1717
| Fugue on a theme by Albinoni
| B min.
| Keyboard
| data-sort-value="000.36: 178" | 36: 178
| data-sort-value="V/09 2: 118" | V/9.2: 118
| data-sort-value="after BWV 0951a;" | after BWV 951a; in SBB P 801
| 
|- style="background: #F5F6CE;"
| data-sort-value="0951.A00" | 951a
| data-sort-value="395.002" | 8.
| data-sort-value="1715-12-31" | 1714–1717
| Fugue on a theme by Albinoni (early version)
| B min.
| Keyboard
| data-sort-value="000.36: 221" | 36: 221
| data-sort-value="V/09 2: 127" | V/9.2: 127
| after Albinoni (theme); → BWV 951; in D-LEm Poel. mus. Ms. 9
| 
|-
| data-sort-value="0952.000" | 952
| data-sort-value="395.003" | 8.
| 
| Fugue
| C maj.
| Keyboard
| data-sort-value="000.36: 184" | 36: 184
| data-sort-value="V/09 2: 176" | V/9.2: 176
| 
| 
|- style="background: #E3F6CE;"
| data-sort-value="0953.000" | 953
| data-sort-value="395.004" | 8.
| data-sort-value="1723-07-01" | 1720–1726
| Fugue a 3, Klavierbüchlein WFB No. 31
| C maj.
| Keyboard
| data-sort-value="000.36: 186" | 36: 186451: 220
| data-sort-value="V/05: 046" | V/5: 46
| 
| 
|-
| data-sort-value="0954.000" | 954
| data-sort-value="396.001" | 8.
| data-sort-value="1709-12-31" | early work?
| Fugue on a theme by Reincken
| B♭ maj.
| Keyboard
| data-sort-value="000.42: 050" | 42: 50
| V/11: 200
| after Reincken, Hortus Musicus No. 2/2 (theme)
| 
|- style="background: #F6E3CE;"
| data-sort-value="0955.000" | 955
| data-sort-value="396.002" | 8.
| data-sort-value="1709-12-31" | early work
| Fugue
| B♭ maj.
| Keyboard
| data-sort-value="000.42: 055" | 42: 55
| data-sort-value="V/12: 060" | V/12: 60
| data-sort-value="after BWV 0955a;" | after BWV 955a; in SBB P 425, P 804
| 
|- style="background: #F6E3CE;"
| data-sort-value="0955.A00" | 955a
| data-sort-value="396.003" | 8.
| data-sort-value="1709-12-31" | early work
| Fugue
| B♭ maj.
| Organ
| data-sort-value="000.42: 298" | 42: 298
| data-sort-value="V/12: 065" | V/12: 65
| by Erselius?; → BWV 955; in SBB P 247, P 595
| 
|-
| data-sort-value="0959.000" | 959
| data-sort-value="396.007" | 8.
| 
| Fugue
| A min.
| Keyboard
| data-sort-value="000.42: 208" | 42: 208
| data-sort-value="V/09 2: 178" | V/9.2: 178
| by Bach?
| 
|-
| data-sort-value="0961.000" | 961
| data-sort-value="397.003" | 8.
| data-sort-value="1729-12-31" | ?
| Fughetta
| C min.
| Keyboard
| data-sort-value="000.36: 154" | 36: 154
| data-sort-value="V/09 2: 182" | V/9.2: 182
| in SBB P 823
| 
|- style="background: #F6E3CE;"
| data-sort-value="0963.000" | 963
| data-sort-value="397.005" | 8.
| data-sort-value="1709-12-31" | early work
| Sonata for keyboard
| D maj.
| Keyboard
| data-sort-value="000.36: 019" | 36: 19
| data-sort-value="V/10: 032" | V/10: 32
| in SBB P 804
| 
|- style="background: #F6E3CE;"
| data-sort-value="0965.000" | 965
| data-sort-value="398.002" | 8.
| data-sort-value="1715-12-31" | 1714–1717or earlier
| Sonata for keyboard after Reincken
| A min.
| Keyboard
| data-sort-value="000.42: 029" | 42: 29
| V/11: 173
| after Reincken, Hortus Musicus No. 1/1–/5; in SBB P 803
| 
|- style="background: #F6E3CE;"
| data-sort-value="0966.000" | 966
| data-sort-value="398.003" | 8.
| data-sort-value="1715-12-31" | 1714–1717or earlier
| Sonata for keyboard after Reincken
| A min.
| Keyboard
| data-sort-value="000.42: 042" | 42: 42
| V/11: 188
| after Reincken, Hortus Musicus No. 3/1–/5; in SBB P 803
| 
|- style="background: #F6E3CE;"
| data-sort-value="0967.000" | 967
| data-sort-value="399.001" | 8.
| data-sort-value="1705-12-31" | 1704–1707
| Sonata transcription, 1st movement
| A min.
| Keyboard
| data-sort-value="000.45 1: 168" | 451: 168
| data-sort-value="V/09 2: 184" | V/9.2: 184
| in SBB P 804
| 
|- id="NBA V-2" style="background: #E3F6CE;"
| data-sort-value="0971.000" | 971
| data-sort-value="399.005" | 8.
| data-sort-value="1734-07-01" | 1733–1735
| Italian Concerto (Clavier-Übung II No. 1)
| F maj.
| Harpsichord
| data-sort-value="000.03: 139" | 3: 139
| data-sort-value="V/02: 002" | V/2: 2
| 
| 
|- style="background: #F6E3CE;"
| data-sort-value="0972.000" | 972
| data-sort-value="400.001" | 8.
| data-sort-value="1714-01-15" | July 1713–July 1714
| data-sort-value="Concerto for solo keyboard 01" | Concerto for solo keyboard (1/16)
| D maj.
| Keyboard
| data-sort-value="000.42: 059" | 42: 59
| data-sort-value="V/11: 003" | V/11: 3
| data-sort-value="after Vivaldi, Op. 3 No. 09" | after Vivaldi, Op. 3 No. 9
| 
|- 
| data-sort-value="0972.A00" | 972a
| data-sort-value="400.002" | 8.
| data-sort-value="1714-01-15" | July 1713–July 1714
| data-sort-value="Concerto for solo keyboard 01a" | Concerto for solo keyboard (1/16), early version
| D maj.
| Keyboard
| 
| V/11: 161
| data-sort-value="after Vivaldi, Op. 3 No. 09" | after Vivaldi, Op. 3 No. 9
| 
|- style="background: #F6E3CE;"
| data-sort-value="0973.000" | 973
| data-sort-value="400.003" | 8.
| data-sort-value="1714-01-15" | July 1713–July 1714
| data-sort-value="Concerto for solo keyboard 02" | Concerto for solo keyboard (2/16)
| G maj.
| Keyboard
| data-sort-value="000.42: 059" | 42: 59
| data-sort-value="V/11: 012" | V/11: 12
| data-sort-value="after Vivaldi, Op. 7 No. 08" | after Vivaldi, Op. 7 No. 8
| 
|- style="background: #F6E3CE;"
| data-sort-value="0974.000" | 974
| data-sort-value="400.004" | 8.
| data-sort-value="1714-01-15" | July 1713–July 1714
| data-sort-value="Concerto for solo keyboard 03" | Concerto for solo keyboard (3/16)
| D min.
| Keyboard
| data-sort-value="000.42: 059" | 42: 59
| data-sort-value="V/11: 020" | V/11: 20
| after Marcello, A., Oboe Concerto
| 
|- style="background: #F6E3CE;"
| data-sort-value="0975.000" | 975
| data-sort-value="400.005" | 8.
| data-sort-value="1714-01-15" | July 1713–July 1714
| data-sort-value="Concerto for solo keyboard 04" | Concerto for solo keyboard (4/16)
| G min.
| Keyboard
| data-sort-value="000.42: 059" | 42: 59
| data-sort-value="V/11: 030" | V/11: 30
| data-sort-value="after Vivaldi, Op. 4 No. 06" | after Vivaldi, Op. 4 No. 6
| 
|- style="background: #F6E3CE;"
| data-sort-value="0976.000" | 976
| data-sort-value="400.006" | 8.
| data-sort-value="1714-01-15" | July 1713–July 1714
| data-sort-value="Concerto for solo keyboard 05" | Concerto for solo keyboard (5/16)
| C maj.
| Keyboard
| data-sort-value="000.42: 059" | 42: 59
| data-sort-value="V/11: 039" | V/11: 39
| after Vivaldi, Op. 3 No. 12
| 
|- style="background: #F6E3CE;"
| data-sort-value="0977.000" | 977
| data-sort-value="400.007" | 8.
| data-sort-value="1714-01-15" | July 1713–July 1714
| data-sort-value="Concerto for solo keyboard 06" | Concerto for solo keyboard (6/16)
| C maj.
| Keyboard
| data-sort-value="000.42: 059" | 42: 59
| data-sort-value="V/11: 050" | V/11: 50
| after unknown model
| 
|- id="after Vivaldi" style="background: #F6E3CE;"
| data-sort-value="0978.000" | 978
| data-sort-value="400.008" | 8.
| data-sort-value="1714-01-15" | July 1713–July 1714
| data-sort-value="Concerto for solo keyboard 07" | Concerto for solo keyboard (7/16)
| F maj.
| Keyboard
| data-sort-value="000.42: 059" | 42: 59
| data-sort-value="V/11: 056" | V/11: 56
| data-sort-value="after Vivaldi, Op. 3 No. 03" | after Vivaldi, Op. 3 No. 3 (RV 310)
| 
|- style="background: #F6E3CE;"
| data-sort-value="0979.000" | 979
| data-sort-value="400.009" | 8.
| data-sort-value="1714-01-15" | July 1713–July 1714
| data-sort-value="Concerto for solo keyboard 08" | Concerto for solo keyboard (8/16)
| B min.
| Keyboard
| data-sort-value="000.42: 059" | 42: 59
| data-sort-value="V/11: 064" | V/11: 64
| after Vivaldi, RV 813 (previously: Torelli)
| 
|- style="background: #F6E3CE;"
| data-sort-value="0980.000" | 980
| data-sort-value="400.010" | 8.
| data-sort-value="1714-01-15" | July 1713–July 1714
| data-sort-value="Concerto for solo keyboard 09" | Concerto for solo keyboard (9/16)
| G maj.
| Keyboard
| data-sort-value="000.42: 059" | 42: 59
| data-sort-value="V/11: 079" | V/11: 79
| data-sort-value="after Vivaldi, Op. 4 No. 01" | after Vivaldi, Op. 4 No. 1 (RV 381)
| 
|- style="background: #F6E3CE;"
| data-sort-value="0981.000" | 981
| data-sort-value="400.011" | 8.
| data-sort-value="1714-01-15" | July 1713–July 1714
| data-sort-value="Concerto for solo keyboard 10" | Concerto for solo keyboard (10/16)
| C min.
| Keyboard
| data-sort-value="000.42: 059" | 42: 59
| data-sort-value="V/11: 090" | V/11: 90
| after Marcello, B., Op. 1 No. 2
| 
|- style="background: #F6E3CE;"
| data-sort-value="0982.000" | 982
| data-sort-value="400.012" | 8.
| data-sort-value="1714-01-15" | July 1713–July 1714
| data-sort-value="Concerto for solo keyboard 11" | Concerto for solo keyboard (11/16)
| B♭ maj.
| Keyboard
| data-sort-value="000.42: 059" | 42: 59
| V/11: 100
| after J. E. of Saxe-Weimar, Op. 1 No. 1 
| 
|- style="background: #F6E3CE;"
| data-sort-value="0983.000" | 983
| data-sort-value="400.013" | 8.
| data-sort-value="1714-01-15" | July 1713–July 1714
| data-sort-value="Concerto for solo keyboard 12" | Concerto for solo keyboard (12/16)
| G min.
| Keyboard
| data-sort-value="000.42: 059" | 42: 59
| V/11: 110
| after unknown model
| 
|- 
| data-sort-value="0984.000" | 984
| data-sort-value="400.014" | 8.
| data-sort-value="1714-01-15" | July 1713–July 1714
| data-sort-value="Concerto for solo keyboard 13" | Concerto for solo keyboard (13/16)
| C maj.
| Keyboard
| data-sort-value="000.42: 059" | 42: 59
| V/11: 118
| after J. E. of Saxe-Weimar, lost Concerto; → BWV 595
| 
|-
| data-sort-value="0985.000" | 985
| data-sort-value="400.015" | 8.
| data-sort-value="1714-01-15" | July 1713–July 1714
| data-sort-value="Concerto for solo keyboard 14" | Concerto for solo keyboard (14/16)
| G min.
| Keyboard
| data-sort-value="000.42: 059" | 42: 59
| V/11: 128
| after Telemann, TWV 51:g1
| 
|-
| data-sort-value="0986.000" | 986
| data-sort-value="400.016" | 8.
| data-sort-value="1714-01-15" | July 1713–July 1714
| data-sort-value="Concerto for solo keyboard 15" | Concerto for solo keyboard (15/16)
| G min.
| Keyboard
| data-sort-value="000.42: 059" | 42: 59
| V/11: 137
| after unknown model
| 
|- style="background: #F6E3CE;"
| data-sort-value="0987.000" | 987
| data-sort-value="400.017" | 8.
| data-sort-value="1714-01-15" | July 1713–July 1714
| data-sort-value="Concerto for solo keyboard 16" | Concerto for solo keyboard (16/16)
| D min.
| Keyboard
| data-sort-value="000.42: 059" | 42: 59
| V/11: 142
| after J. E. of Saxe-Weimar, Op. 1 No. 4
| 
|- id="Goldberg Variations" style="background: #E3F6CE;"
| data-sort-value="0988.000" | 988
| data-sort-value="402.003" | 8.
| data-sort-value="1741-12-31" | 1741–1742
| Goldberg Variations (Clavier-Übung IV)
| G maj.
| Harpsichord
| data-sort-value="000.03: 263" | 3: 263
| data-sort-value="V/02: 069" | V/2: 69
| → BWV 1087
| 
|- style="background: #F5F6CE;"
| data-sort-value="0988.001" | 988/1
| data-sort-value="402.003" | 8.
| data-sort-value="1740-07-01" | 1740? (AMB)
| data-sort-value="Notebook A. M. Bach (1725) No. 26" | Notebook A. M. Bach (1725) No. 26 Aria of the Goldberg Variations
| G maj.
| Harpsichord
| data-sort-value="000.03: 263" | 3: 263
| data-sort-value="V/04: 103" | V/4: 103
| → BWV 1087
| 
|- style="background: #F5F6CE;"
| data-sort-value="0989.000" | 989
| data-sort-value="404.002" | 8.
| data-sort-value="1710-07-01" | 1707–1713
| Aria variata
| A min.
| Keyboard
| data-sort-value="000.36: 203" | 36: 203
| data-sort-value="V/10: 021" | V/10: 21
| in Andreas-Bach-Buch
| 
|- style="background: #E3F6CE;"
| data-sort-value="0991.000" | 991
| data-sort-value="405.003" | 8.
| data-sort-value="1722-07-01" | 1722
| data-sort-value="Notebook A. M. Bach (1722) No. 07" | Notebook A. M. Bach (1722) No. 7 Air with variations (incomplete)
| C min.
| Keyboard
| data-sort-value="000.43 2: 004" | 432: 4
| data-sort-value="V/04: 040" | V/4: 40
| 
| 
|- style="background: #F5F6CE;"
| data-sort-value="0992.000" | 992
| data-sort-value="405.004" | 8.
| data-sort-value="1705-12-31" | 1704–1707
| Capriccio on the departure of a beloved brother
| B♭ maj.
| Keyboard
| data-sort-value="000.36: 190" | 36: 190
| data-sort-value="V/10: 003" | V/10: 3
| in Möllersche Handschrift
| 
|- style="background: #F6E3CE;"
| data-sort-value="0993.000" | 993
| data-sort-value="406.002 | 8.
| data-sort-value="1705-05-01" | 1705
| 
| E maj.
| Keyboard
| data-sort-value="000.36: 197" | 36: 197
| data-sort-value="V/10: 012" | V/10: 12
| in SBB P 804
| 
|- style="background: #E3F6CE;"
| data-sort-value="0994.000" | 994						
| data-sort-value="406.003" | 8.
| data-sort-value="1720-07-01" | 1720
| data-sort-value="Klavierbüchlein für Wilhelm Friedemann Bach No. 01" | Klavierbüchlein WFB No. 1: Applicatio
| C maj.
| Keyboard
| data-sort-value="000.36: 237" | 36: 237451:214
| data-sort-value="V/05: 004" | V/5: 4
| 
| 
|- id="BWV Chapter 9" style="background: #D8D8D8;"
| data-sort-value="0994.z99" | 9.
| data-sort-value="407.001" colspan="8" | Lute compositions (see also: List of solo lute compositions by Johann Sebastian Bach)
| data-sort-value="1172a" | Up ↑
|- style="background: #E3F6CE;"
| data-sort-value="0995.000" | 995
| data-sort-value="407.002" | 9.
| data-sort-value="1730-07-01" | Fall 1727 – Winter 1731
| Suite for lute
| G min.
| Lu
| 
| data-sort-value="V/10: 081" | V/10: 81
| after BWV 1011Johann Sebastian Bach, edited by E. Capriani. "Documenti storici" in Opere per Liuto, Vol. III. Rovereto (1977)Artzt. "The third Lute Suite by Bach: Three Manuscripts and their Implications" in Journal of the Lute Society of America (1968), pp. 9ffRadke. Fs Engel, pp. 271ffSchulze. Mf 1968, pp. 203fSchulze. StSiegele Diss
| 
|- style="background: #F6E3CE;"
| data-sort-value="0996.000" | 996
| data-sort-value="407.003" | 9.
| data-sort-value="1713-07-01" | 1710–1717 (JGW)
| Suite for lute
| E min.
| Lu (Lw?)
| data-sort-value="000.45 1: 149" | 451: 149
| data-sort-value="V/10: 094" | V/10: 94
| data-sort-value="in SBB P 0801" | in SBB P 801, pp. 385–395Dömling/Kohlhase, AcM 1971: 108fSpitta I: 768; II: 646
| 
|- style="background: #F5F6CE;"
| data-sort-value="0997.100" | 997.1
| data-sort-value="408.002" | 9.
| data-sort-value="1729-12-31" | 1720–1739
| Suite (1st version)
| C min.
| Lw
| data-sort-value="000.45 1: 156" | 451: 156
| V/10: 102
| data-sort-value="in SBB P 0650" | in SBB P 650; → BWV 997.2
| 
|- style="background: #F6E3CE;"
| data-sort-value="0997.200" | 997.2
| data-sort-value="408.002" | 9.
| data-sort-value="1729-12-31" | 1720–1739
| Suite (2nd version)
| C min.
| Lu
| data-sort-value="000.45 1: 156" | 451: 156
| V/10: 102
| in D LEm III 11.5; after BWV 997.1
| 
|- style="background: #E3F6CE;"
| data-sort-value="0998.000" | 998
| data-sort-value="409.001" | 9.
| data-sort-value="1740-07-01" | 1735–1745
| Prelude, Fugue and Allegro
| E♭ maj.
| Lu (or) Hc
| data-sort-value="000.45 1: 141" | 451: 141
| V/10: 114
| Dombois. "The Allegro from J. S. Bachs Prelude, Fugue and Allegro in E-flat major" in Lute Society Journal (1972), pp. 25ff, 51ff
| 
|- style="background: #F6E3CE;"
| data-sort-value="0999.000" | 999 
| data-sort-value="409.002" | 9.
| data-sort-value="1720-07-01" | 1717–1723
| Prelude for lute (Twelve Little Preludes No. 3)
| C min.
| Lu
| data-sort-value="000.36: 120" | 36: 119
| V/10: 122
| data-sort-value="in SBB P 0804" | in SBB P 804, pp. 101–103Badura-Skoda
| 
|-
| data-sort-value="1000.000" | 1000
| data-sort-value="409.003" | 9.
| data-sort-value="1750-01-01" | after 1720
| Fugue
| G min.
| Lu
| 
| V/10: 124
| after BWV 1001/2; → 539/2; in MB Lpz III.11.4
| 
|- style="background: #E3F6CE;"
| data-sort-value="1006.200" | 1006.2
| data-sort-value="410.002" | 9.
| data-sort-value="1737-12-31" | 1736–1737 
| Suite
| E maj.
| Lu?
| data-sort-value="000.42: 016" | 42: 16
| V/10: 134
| after BWV 1006.1Hofmann, Fs Scheide: 14~154Zingel. "Bach auf der Harfe" in Schweizerische Musikzeitung (1964), pp. 286ff
| 
|}

Other keyboard and lute compositions

Canons (BWV 1072–1078)

Late contrapuntal works (BWV 1079–1080)

 BWV 1079 – The Musical Offering (Musikalisches Opfer) – some pieces intended for fortepiano
 BWV 1080 – The Art of Fugue (Die Kunst der Fuge) - some pieces indicated as being for a two-manual harpsichord

Spurious and doubtful works in Anna Magdalena's Notebooks (BWV Anh. 113–132)

Piano transcriptions

References

Sources

External links

 
Bach, Johann Sebastian
Keyboard and lute compositions by Johann Sebastian Bach, List of
Articles containing video clips